

6001–6100 

|-
| 6001 Thales ||  || Thales of Miletus (c. 625–547 BC), Ancient Greek philosopher || 
|-id=002
| 6002 Eetion || 1988 RO || Eetion, from Greek mythology. He was the King of Thebe Hypoplakia, father of Andromache, and father-in-law of Hector. Eetion was killed during the raid on Thebe by Achilles. || 
|-id=006
| 6006 Anaximandros ||  || Anaximander (c. 610–546 BC), Ancient Greek astronomer || 
|-id=007
| 6007 Billevans ||  || Bill Evans (1929–1980), American jazz pianist || 
|-id=009
| 6009 Yuzuruyoshii ||  || Yuzuru Yoshii (born 1951) is a Japanese astronomer and director of the Institute of Astronomy, University of Tokyo. His research interest includes formation and evolution of galaxies, galactic dynamics, and observational cosmology. He is famous for his discovery of the thick-disk component of the Milky Way galaxy. || 
|-id=010
| 6010 Lyzenga || 1990 OE || Gregory Allen Lyzenga, American geophysicist, Satellite Geodesy and Geodynamics Systems Group, Jet Propulsion Laboratory, and, Physics Department, Harvey Mudd College. || 
|-id=011
| 6011 Tozzi ||  || Gian Paolo Tozzi (born 1949), Italian astronomer at the Arcetri Observatory near Florence, Italy || 
|-id=012
| 6012 Williammurdoch ||  || William Murdoch (1754–1839), a Scottish engineer || 
|-id=013
| 6013 Andanike || 1991 OZ || Andrew (born 1996), David (born 1994), Nicholas (born 1992) and Kevin M. Martinez (born 1989), grandsons of the discoverer Henry E. Holt || 
|-id=014
| 6014 Chribrenmark ||  || Christopher (born 1988), Brendan (born 1989) and Mark Moeller (born 1990), grandsons of the discoverer Henry E. Holt || 
|-id=015
| 6015 Paularego ||  || Paula Rego (born 1935), Luso-British graphic artist || 
|-id=016
| 6016 Carnelli ||  || Ian Carnelli (born 1976), a major contributor in developing asteroid mission concepts at ESA || 
|-id=018
| 6018 Pierssac ||  || Piers Sellers (1955–2016), a British-American meteorologist, NASA astronaut and Director of Goddard Space Flight Center's Earth Science Division || 
|-id=019
| 6019 Telford ||  || Thomas Telford (1757–1834), a Scottish civil engineer and famed builder of roads, canals, bridges, tunnels and harbors. || 
|-id=020
| 6020 Miyamoto ||  || Yukio Miyamoto (born 1921), Japanese astronomer, director of Seiwa Kougen Observatory || 
|-id=022
| 6022 Jyuro ||  || Jurō Kobayashi (born 1949), Japanese amateur astronomer and discoverer of minor planets || 
|-id=023
| 6023 Tsuyashima ||  || Takaaki Tsuyashima (born 1949), Japanese astronomer, director of the Kumamoto Kenmin Observatory || 
|-id=024
| 6024 Ochanomizu ||  || Ochanomizu, a neighborhood in Tokyo, Japan || 
|-id=025
| 6025 Naotosato ||  || Naoto Satō (born 1953), active amateur astronomer and junior high school science teacher. || 
|-id=026
| 6026 Xenophanes ||  || Xenophanes (570–475 BC), Ancient Greek philosopher || 
|-id=029
| 6029 Edithrand || 1948 AG || Edith Wirtanen, who discovered this minor planet on a photographic plate taken by her husband Carl A. Wirtanen || 
|-id=030
| 6030 Zolensky ||  || Michael Zolensky (born 1955), American meteoriticist and curator of interplanetary dust at NASA's Johnson Space Center, has been at the forefront of understanding the origin of interplanetary dust particles, their relationship to carbonaceous chondrites and the processes that formed them on comets and minor planets (Src) || 
|-id=031
| 6031 Ryokan ||  || Ryōkan (1758–1831), a Zen Buddhist monk who lived as a hermit in Japan || 
|-id=032
| 6032 Nobel || 1983 PY || Alfred Nobel (1833–1896), Swedish chemist, inventor of dynamite, and philanthropist, founder of the Nobel prize || 
|-id=035
| 6035 Citlaltépetl || 1987 OR || Citlaltépetl, a dormant volcano and the highest mountain (5636 m) in Mexico and lies near to the city of Orizaba. || 
|-id=036
| 6036 Weinberg ||  || Steven Weinberg (1933–2021), American physicist and Nobelist || 
|-id=039
| 6039 Parmenides || 1989 RS || Parmenides (born 515 BC), Ancient Greek philosopher || 
|-id=041
| 6041 Juterkilian || 1990 KL || Klas Juter (born 1962), Swedish architect and photographer, and Danuta Kilian (born 1963), Polish artist. || 
|-id=042
| 6042 Cheshirecat ||  || The Cheshire Cat, a cat appearing in Lewis Carroll's famous fairy tale Alice in Wonderland. Its unique characteristic is its laughing voice that lingers after the cat fades away. || 
|-id=043
| 6043 Aurochs ||  || The aurochs, Bos primigenius † || 
|-id=044
| 6044 Hammer-Purgstall ||  || Joseph von Hammer-Purgstall (1774–1856), Austrian orientalist and historian || 
|-id=049
| 6049 Toda || 1991 VP || Kojun Toda (1879–1951) Japanese astronomer || 
|-id=050
| 6050 Miwablock || 1992 AE || Miwa Block (born 1972), application systems analyst at the Lunar and Planetary Laboratory of the University of Arizona and member of the Spacewatch team. || 
|-id=051
| 6051 Anaximenes ||  || Anaximenes of Miletus (born 545 BC), Ancient Greek philosopher || 
|-id=052
| 6052 Junichi ||  || Junichi Watanabe (born 1960), Japanese astronomer || 
|-id=054
| 6054 Ghiberti || 4019 P-L || Lorenzo Ghiberti (1378–1455), Italian sculptor || 
|-id=055
| 6055 Brunelleschi || 2158 T-3 || Filippo Brunelleschi (1377–1446), Florentine sculptor and architect || 
|-id=056
| 6056 Donatello || 2318 T-3 || Donatello (c. 1386–1466), Italian sculptor of the Renaissance || 
|-id=057
| 6057 Robbia || 5182 T-3 || Luca della Robbia (1400–1482), Italian sculptor. The name also honors several other members of his family. || 
|-id=058
| 6058 Carlnielsen ||  || Carl August Nielsen (1865–1931) is widely recognized as a great Danish composer who is especially noted for his six symphonies. || 
|-id=059
| 6059 Diefenbach || 1979 TA || Karl Wilhelm Diefenbach (1851–1913), a German painter and philosopher. || 
|-id=060
| 6060 Doudleby || 1980 DX || Doudleby, a village in southern Bohemia, near České Budějovice in the Czech Republic. It was first mentioned as a site of a Slavonic fortified settlement above the Malše river in 981. The Gothic church of St. Vincent was built on this site. The region of Doudleby is known for its lively traditional folk customs, including carnivals. Name suggested by J. Ticha and M. Tichy. || 
|-id=062
| 6062 Vespa || 1983 JQ || Vespa, an Italian–made scooter. The naming took place in 1996, in commemoration of its 50th anniversary since its launch. || 
|-id=063
| 6063 Jason || 1984 KB || Jason, Greek mythological hero || 
|-id=064
| 6064 Holašovice ||  || Holašovice, a village in Bohemia, Czech Republic || 
|-id=065
| 6065 Chesneau || 1987 OC || Olivier Chesneau (1972–2014) was a French astronomer. || 
|-id=066
| 6066 Hendricks ||  || John Hendricks (born 1952), founder of Discovery Communications (Discovery Channel; Learning Channel) || 
|-id=068
| 6068 Brandenburg ||  || Brandenburg, a federal state of Germany || 
|-id=069
| 6069 Cevolani ||  || Giordano Cevolani (born 1945), Italian geophysicist †  || 
|-id=070
| 6070 Rheinland ||  || Rhineland, a region in western Germany along the Rhine River || 
|-id=071
| 6071 Sakitama ||  || Sakitama, located in the city of Gyōda and from which Saitama prefecture takes its name, is known for its burial mounds, constructed from clay and rocks between the fourth and seventh centuries. || 
|-id=072
| 6072 Hooghoudt || 1280 T-1 || Bernard Hooghoudt (1924–1995), developer of the Dutch radio telescopes || 
|-id=074
| 6074 Bechtereva || 1968 QE || Natalia Bekhtereva (1924–2008), was a Russian neurophysiologist, director of the Institute of Experimental Medicine in St. Petersburg for many years and founder of the Institute of the Human Brain of the Russian Academy of Sciences. Bechtereva laid the foundation for basic research into the physiology of healthy and diseased human brains. She discovered the cerebral mechanisms that optimize cognitive processes – the error detector. The theory of the brain's stable pathological state as the adaptation background for many chronic diseases was developed by Bechtereva, opening up new opportunities for their treatment. Name suggested by the Institute of the Human Brain and the Institute of Applied Astronomy. || 
|-id=075
| 6075 Zajtsev ||  || Aleksandr Leonidovich Zaitsev (1945–2021), Russian radio engineer and astronomer † || 
|-id=076
| 6076 Plavec || 1980 CR || Miroslav Plavec (Mirek Plavec; born 1925), Czech astronomer || 
|-id=077
| 6077 Messner || 1980 TM || Reinhold Messner (born 1944), an Italian mountaineer, adventurer and writer || 
|-id=078
| 6078 Burt ||  || Burton G. Shoemaker (born 1912), uncle of Eugene M. Shoemaker || 
|-id=079
| 6079 Gerokurat ||  || Gero Kurat (born 1938), Austrian curator of the meteorite collection of the Natural History Museum in Vienna, and president of the Meteoritical Society || 
|-id=080
| 6080 Lugmair ||  || Günter Lugmair (born 1940), German cosmochemist and meteoriticist and director of the Max-Planck-Institut for Chemistry at Mainz || 
|-id=081
| 6081 Cloutis ||  || Edward Cloutis (born 1958), Canadian physicist and professor at the University of Winnipeg || 
|-id=082
| 6082 Timiryazev ||  || Kliment Timiryazev (1843–1920), a Russian physiologist and botanist, was a member of the Imperial St. Petersburg Academy of Sciences || 
|-id=083
| 6083 Janeirabloom ||  || Jane Ira Bloom (born 1955), an American soprano saxophonist and jazz composer. She is known for her chromatic, lyrical playing and compositions for orchestra, unusual ensembles and dance troupes. Her performances with traditional jazz groups appear on several critically acclaimed recordings. As the first musician in the NASA Art Program, she wrote "Most Distant Galaxy" and "Einstein's Red/Blue Universe", the latter on commission for the American Composers' Orchestra. || 
|-id=084
| 6084 Bascom || 1985 CT || Florence Bascom (1862–1945), the first woman geologist in the United States. She was an expert in crystallography, mineralogy and petrography and worked in the fields of metamorphism and crystallography in their infancy. Bascom was also an educator who trained a generation of young women as professionals at Bryn Mawr, where she founded the geology department. She was the first woman hired by the U.S. Geological Survey and the first woman elected to the Council of the Geological Society of America. Her pioneering work earned her a position among the country's hundred leading geologists in the early twentieth century. || 
|-id=085
| 6085 Fraethi ||  || Frede Pedersen, father of one of the discoverers; Frede, an old Danish name meaning peace, comes from the old Nordic name Fraethi. || 
|-id=086
| 6086 Vrchlický || 1987 VU || Jaroslav Vrchlický (1853–1912), born Emil Frída, Czech poet and one of the most prolific of all Czech writers. His works included lyric and epic poetry, plays and Czech translations of major European writers. || 
|-id=087
| 6087 Lupo || 1988 FK || Bob Lupo, Boston-born Arizona restaurateur. Wearing a black hat and a genial smile, Lupo typifies the Western cowboy of today's imagination. Born in Boston, he sought his fortune in the West, becoming a registered farrier and at one time taking part in team roping in Colorado. Today he owns and manages a fine Western-style eatery, Horseman Lodge and Restaurant, in Flagstaff, Arizona, where he has served outstanding seafood (a heritage from Boston), steaks and barbecue to the many renowned visiting scientists and others who have entered his doors. || 
|-id=088
| 6088 Hoshigakubo || 1988 UH || Hoshigakubo, in Niyodo, Kōchi, Japan. The name refers to a section of low ground at Choja, a mountainous place in the western part of Kochi prefecture. Legend has it that a meteorite fell there in olden times. Now there is a pond 20 meters across. || 
|-id=089
| 6089 Izumi ||  || Izumi-ku, Sendai, a ward in the northern part of the city of Sendai, Japan || 
|-id=090
| 6090 Aulis || 1989 DJ || Aulis was the port in Boetia where the Greek fleet gathered to set sail for Troy and where Iphigenia was sacrificed by Agamemnon. || 
|-id=091
| 6091 Mitsuru ||  || Mitsuru Soma (born 1954), Japanese astronomer || 
|-id=092
| 6092 Johnmason || 1990 MN || John W. Mason (born 1954) has contributed to research on comets and meteors and to the popularization of astronomy. He was president of the British Astronomical Association during 1993–1995. || 
|-id=093
| 6093 Makoto ||  || Makoto Yoshikawa (born 1962), Japanese astronomer || 
|-id=094
| 6094 Hisako ||  || Hisako Hioki (born 1929), the mother of the discoverer and an expert seamstress. || 
|-id=097
| 6097 Koishikawa ||  || Masahiro Koishikawa (born 1952), a Japanese astronomer, staff member of the Sendai Astronomical Observatory and a discoverer of minor planets || 
|-id=098
| 6098 Mutojunkyu ||  || Junkyu Muto (born 1950) is famous worldwide as a Japanese sculptor and painter living in Rome. His series of Kazenowa ("circle wind") sculptures is particularly well known, and in 2000 one of them was installated permanently at the papal villa in Castel Gandolfo as its first abstract sculpture as a monument to world peace || 
|-id=099
| 6099 Saarland ||  || Saarland, a German state || 
|-id=100
| 6100 Kunitomoikkansai ||  || Ikkansai Kunitomo (1778–1840) Japanese amateur astronomer, observer of the Sun, Moon and planets, and builder several Gregorian reflecting telescopes from his own design || 
|}

6101–6200 

|-
| 6101 Tomoki || 1993 EG || Tomoki Nakamura (born 1966), an associate professor of earth and planetary sciences at Kyushu University, Japan, who specializes in research on primitive solar system materials, most recently leading to the discovery of high-temperature chondrule-like materials in the stardust samples || 
|-id=102
| 6102 Visby ||  || The city of Visby on the island of Gotland, Sweden || 
|-id=104
| 6104 Takao || 1993 HZ || Takao Saito (born 1930), Japanese astrogeophysicist at Tohoku University, Japan || 
|-id=105
| 6105 Verrocchio || 4580 P-L || Andrea del Verrocchio (1435–1488), Florentine sculptor || 
|-id=106
| 6106 Stoss || 6564 P-L || Veit Stoss (c. 1450–1533), German sculptor and wood-carver || 
|-id=107
| 6107 Osterbrock || 1948 AF || Donald Edward Osterbrock (1924–2007), American astrophysicist || 
|-id=108
| 6108 Glebov || 1971 QN || Igor' Alekseevich Glebov (born 1914), scientist in the field of electrical engineering and power engineering, since 1975 director of the Science Research Institute of Electric Machine Engineering in St. Petersburg. Glebov is renowned for his work in control systems for power turbogenerators and his application of superconductivity in electric machine engineering. || 
|-id=109
| 6109 Balseiro || 1975 QC || José Antonio Balseiro (1919–1962), Argentine nuclear physicist || 
|-id=110
| 6110 Kazak ||  || Yurij Ivanovich Kazak (born 1949), surgeon at Bakhchisaraj district hospital, treated many staff members of the Crimean Astrophysical Observatory. A skilled and kind doctor, he is always ready to help people || 
|-id=111
| 6111 Davemckay ||  || David S. McKay (1936–2013), American lunar geologist and meteoriticist; Chief Scientist for astrobiology at the Johnson Space Center. || 
|-id=112
| 6112 Ludolfschultz ||  || Ludolf Schultz (born 1937), German cosmochemist and meteoriticist; professor at Johannes Gutenberg University of Mainz || 
|-id=113
| 6113 Tsap ||  || Teodor Teodorovich Tsap (born 1930) and his son Yurij Teodorovich Tsap (born 1966) are astronomers at the Crimean Astrophysical Observatory. They have made a significant contribution to observations and theory of various solar phenomena. Teodor Tsap, with coauthors, discovered oscillations in the sun with a period of 160 min || 
|-id=114
| 6114 Dalla-Degregori ||  || Lucio Dalla (1943–2012) (born 1943) and Francesco De Gregori (born 1951), two popular Italian singers and songwriters || 
|-id=115
| 6115 Martinduncan ||  || Martin J. Duncan (born 1950), Canadian astronomer at Queen's University, Kingston, Ontario || 
|-id=116
| 6116 Still ||  || William Grant Still (1895–1978), American composer || 
|-id=117
| 6117 Brevardastro ||  || The Brevard Astronomical Society, a very active amateur astronomy community in Brevard County, Florida, where the Kennedy Space Center, Cape Canaveral is located || 
|-id=118
| 6118 Mayuboshi ||  || There is a Japanese poem whose subject is Mt. Bizan in the Manyosyu, an anthology of the Nara Era. Mt. Bizan is a small mountain that looks like an eyebrow, and is one of the symbols of Tokushima. This whimsical name uses the character for eyebrow, "mayu", combined with "boshi" (star). || 
|-id=119
| 6119 Hjorth || 1986 XH || Jens Hjorth, Danish astrophysicist at University of Copenhagen || 
|-id=120
| 6120 Anhalt || 1987 QR || The Principality of Anhalt, a former State of the Holy Roman Empire, located in Central Germany || 
|-id=121
| 6121 Plachinda ||  || Sergej Ivanovich Plachinda (born 1951), astronomer at Crimea–Nauchnij has contributed to investigations on the global magnetic fields of stars of different types. His wife, Nelly Ivanovna Merkulova (born 1949), is a well-known investigator of variability in Seyfert galaxies || 
|-id=122
| 6122 Henrard ||  || Jacques Henrard (born 1940), professor of mathematics at the University of Namur in Belgium || 
|-id=123
| 6123 Aristoteles ||  || Aristotle (384–322 BC), Ancient Greek philosopher || 
|-id=124
| 6124 Mecklenburg ||  || Mecklenburg, a historical region in northern Germany || 
|-id=125
| 6125 Singto || 1989 CN || Singto Pukahuta (1915–2007) was a prominent Thai astronomy educator and author. He was a founder and Director of the Bangkok Planetarium, and president of the Thai Astronomical Society. One of his books, Star Tales, was included in the List of 100 Good Books that Thai Children and Young Adults Should Read || 
|-id=126
| 6126 Hubelmatt ||  || Hubelmatt, Swiss borough and school in the city of Lucerne, Switzerland, and the location of the Hubelmatt Observatory operated by the Astronomical Society of Lucerne. || 
|-id=127
| 6127 Hetherington || 1989 HD || Ernest Hetherington, good friend of the mother of the American discoverer Eleanor Helin || 
|-id=128
| 6128 Lasorda || 1989 LA || Tommy Lasorda (1927–2021), former manager of the Los Angeles Dodgers || 
|-id=129
| 6129 Demokritos ||  || Democritus (c. 460–370 BC), Ancient Greek philosopher || 
|-id=130
| 6130 Hutton ||  || James Hutton (1726–1797), Scottish founder of modern geology || 
|-id=131
| 6131 Towen ||  || Tobias C. Owen (born 1936), American planetary scientist of the Institute for Astronomy of the University of Hawaii || 
|-id=132
| 6132 Danielson ||  || G. Edward Danielson (1939–2005), an American Engineer, see Danielson (crater) || 
|-id=133
| 6133 Royaldutchastro ||  || The Royal Netherlands Association for Meteorology and Astronomy (KNVWS, Koninklijke Nederlandse Vereniging voor Weer- en Sterrenkunde), established in 1901, is a federation of more than fifty amateur organizations and public observatories || 
|-id=134
| 6134 Kamagari ||  || The Japanese town Kamagari in Hiroshima prefecture. The Kamagari astronomical observatory is located in this area. || 
|-id=135
| 6135 Billowen ||  || William Mann Owen Jr. (born 1954), an astronomer at the Jet Propulsion Laboratory || 
|-id=136
| 6136 Gryphon || 1990 YH || Gryphon, a fictional character in Lewis Carroll's Alice's adventures in Wonderland. The Gryphon had an eagle's head, a front half with wings and talons, and at the back a lion's legs and tail. || 
|-id=137
| 6137 Johnfletcher || 1991 BY || John Fletcher (born 1947), British amateur astronomer and public educator || 
|-id=138
| 6138 Miguelhernández ||  || Miguel Hernández (1910–1942) was a poet who fought for peace and the Republic during the Spanish Civil War. He was incarcerated in several fascist prison camps until his death at the summit of the repression. His name went into oblivion until the collapse of the fascist dictatorship, when his plays and poems were rediscovered. || 
|-id=139
| 6139 Naomi ||  || Naomi Sugie (born 1966), wife of Japanese astronomer Atsushi Sugie, who discovered this minor planet || 
|-id=140
| 6140 Kubokawa ||  || Kazuo Kubokawa (1903–1943), a Japanese astronomer and discoverer of 1139 Atami || 
|-id=141
| 6141 Durda ||  || Daniel David Durda (born 1965), an American astronomer and board member of the B612 Foundation Src || 
|-id=142
| 6142 Tantawi || 1993 FP || Muhammad Tantawi (1845–1889) was an Egyptian astronomer and mathematician, who was born in Tanta and later settled in Damascus, Syria. He is well known for reconstructing the ancient sundial in Umayyad Mosque in the ancient city of Damascus, which was originally made by Syrian astronomer Ibn al-Shatir. || 
|-id=143
| 6143 Pythagoras || 1993 JV || Pythagoras (c. 570–495 BC), Greek philosopher and mathematician || 
|-id=144
| 6144 Kondojiro ||  || Jiro Kondo (born 1951), a Japanese Egyptologist and amateur astronomer || 
|-id=145
| 6145 Riemenschneider || 2630 P-L || Tilman Riemenschneider (1460–1531), German sculptor || 
|-id=146
| 6146 Adamkrafft || 3262 T-2 || Adam Kraft (c. 1460–1509), German sculptor || 
|-id=147
| 6147 Straub || 1081 T-3 || Johann Baptist Straub (1704–1784), German sculptor || 
|-id=148
| 6148 Ignazgünther || 5119 T-3 || Ignaz Günther (1725–1775), German sculptor || 
|-id=149
| 6149 Pelčák || 1979 SS || Oldřich Pelčák (born 1943), Czech cosmonaut-candidate || 
|-id=150
| 6150 Neukum ||  || Gerhard Neukum (1944–2014), German astronomer and director of the DLR Institute for Planetary Research || 
|-id=151
| 6151 Viget || 1987 WF || Princeton University and its motto "Dei Sub Numine Viget", or "Under the Power of God She Flourishes" || 
|-id=152
| 6152 Empedocles ||  || Empedocles (c. 490–430 BC), Ancient Greek philosopher || 
|-id=153
| 6153 Hershey || 1990 OB || Wesley Lamar Hershey (1913–1989), director of the Caltech "Y" at the California Institute of Technology for 30 years || 
|-id=154
| 6154 Stevesynnott ||  || Stephen P. Synnott (born 1946), American astronomer and discoverer of moons || 
|-id=155
| 6155 Yokosugano ||  || Yōko Sugano, wife of Matsuo Sugano || 
|-id=156
| 6156 Dall ||  || Horace E. Dall (1901–1986), British telescope designer || 
|-id=157
| 6157 Prey ||  || Adalbert Prey (1873–1949), Austrian professor of astronomy in Innsbruck, Prague andVienna || 
|-id=158
| 6158 Shosanbetsu ||  || The Japanese village of Shosanbetsu with its Shosanbetsu Observatory located on Hokkaido. "Shosanbetsu" means a river where the waterfall is flowing out in the native Ainu language. The village has a population of about 1450 and was established in 1909. The observatory operates a 0.65-meter reflector telescope. || 
|-id=159
| 6159 Andréseloy || 1991 YH || Andrés Eloy Martinez (born 1963) is a Mexican astronomer and science popularizer known in his country for his radio dramatization of the novel War of the Worlds. He loves creating science videos for the Internet. His biggest concerns are global warming and an asteroid impact on Earth. || 
|-id=160
| 6160 Minakata || 1993 JF || Kumagusu Minakata, Japanese author and naturalist || 
|-id=161
| 6161 Vojno-Yasenetsky ||  || Luka Voyno-Yasenetsky (1877–1961), Ukrainian surgeon and theologian || 
|-id=162
| 6162 Prokhorov ||  || Yuri Prokhorov (1929–2013), Russian mathematician || 
|-id=163
| 6163 Reimers || 1977 FT || Dieter Reimers (born 1943), German astronomer and director of the Hamburg Observatory || 
|-id=164
| 6164 Gerhardmüller ||  || Gerhard Friedrich Müller (Miller, according to traditional spelling in Russian; 1705–1783), first rector of St. Petersburg University and editor of the first Russian academic journal. He is considered the father of St. Petersburg's historical school, and his works were the foundation for research on the history, ethnography, archeology and geography of Russia and Siberia || 
|-id=165
| 6165 Frolova ||  || Natalia Borisovna Frolova, assistant professor of astronomy at Ural State University in Ekaterinburg. She worked on a detailed catalogue of stars along the path of comet 1P/Halley, and this contributed to the success of the space missions Vega and Giotto. As a leader in educating local schoolchildren about astronomy, she takes an active part in organizing the annual Winter Astronomical Students' School at Kourovskay Observatory || 
|-id=166
| 6166 Univsima ||  || Simferopol State University on the Crimean peninsula, on the occasion of the 18th anniversary of its establishment || 
|-id=167
| 6167 Narmanskij ||  || Vladimir Yakovlevich Narmanskij (born 1948), Crimean amateur astronomer and founder of the "Heliorythm", an amateur research laboratory || 
|-id=168
| 6168 Isnello ||  || Isnello, a pleasant village in Sicily's Madonie Natural Park, has long been famous for its traditional refined embroidery. It is now becoming an important center for astronomy with the realization of the Parco Astronomico delle Madonie, an international center devoted to popularization of and research in astronomy || 
|-id=169
| 6169 Sashakrot ||  || Aleksandr Krot (born 1959), cosmochemist and meteoriticist || 
|-id=170
| 6170 Levasseur || 1981 GP || Anny-Chantal Levasseur-Regourd (born 1945) a French planetary scientist and former astronaut candidate. She has been professor at UPMC in Paris and works at the French National Center for Scientific Research, CNRS. Her research includes comets, the interplanetary medium and interplanetary dust. She has also been a principal investigator when the Giotto spacecraft visited Comet Halley in 1986. || 
|-id=171
| 6171 Uttorp || 1981 UT || Uttorp, a village in southeastern Sweden, is part of a nature reserve used by the local astronomy club Karlskrona Astronomiförening. In 2010 the site, renowned for its dark skies, also saw the launch of an annual astronomy conference open to amateur astronomers and the public. The name was suggested by U. Petersson || 
|-id=172
| 6172 Prokofeana || 1982 TX || Valentina Vladimirovna Prokof'eva (born 1929), Russian astrophysicist at the Crimean Astrophysical Observatory || 
|-id=173
| 6173 Jimwestphal || 1983 AD || James Westphal (1930–2004), American astronomer and director of the Palomar Observatory during the 1990s || 
|-id=174
| 6174 Polybius ||  || Polybius (c. 208–125 BC), Ancient Greek historian || 
|-id=175
| 6175 Cori || 1983 XW || Carl Ferdinand Cori (1896–1984) and Gerty Cori (1896–1957), husband and wife Austro-Hungarian-American biochemists || 
|-id=176
| 6176 Horrigan || 1985 BH || Barbara Llewellyn Horrigan (1915–2005), American member of the Arlington Friends of the Drama (Massachusetts), actress, director, and set and costume designer || 
|-id=177
| 6177 Fécamp ||  || Fécamp is a small town located in Normandy, France. The history of Fécamp rests with that of its abbey || 
|-id=179
| 6179 Brett || 1986 EN || Robin Brett (born 1935), an Australian-born geochemist studies of meteoricist, responsible for the study of the Apollo lunar samples || 
|-id=180
| 6180 Bystritskaya ||  || Ehlina Avraamovna Bystritskaya, distinguished Soviet actress. An actress with Moscow Malyj Theatre since 1958, she is especially popular for her brilliant roles in several films || 
|-id=181
| 6181 Bobweber || 1986 RW || Robert Weber (1926–2008), an American physicist and astronomer, team leader of the Deep Space Satellite Tracking Network, and co-developer of the LINEAR project. He is also a discoverer of minor planets. || 
|-id=182
| 6182 Katygord ||  || Katherine Carson Gordon Kron (1917–2011), astronomer at the Lick Observatory and wife of astronomer Gerald Kron † || 
|-id=183
| 6183 Viscome ||  || George R. Viscome (born 1956), American broadcast technician, astrometrist, and discoverer of minor planets || 
|-id=184
| 6184 Nordlund ||  || Aake Nordlund, Danish astrophysicist and professor of astrophysics at the University of Copenhagen || 
|-id=185
| 6185 Mitsuma || 1987 YD || Shigeo Mitsuma (1956–2012) was a member of Hoshinohiroba (the Japanese Comet Observers Network) and an independent discoverer of C/1987 B1 (Nishikawa-Takamizawa-Tago). He also observed sunspots and search for novae || 
|-id=186
| 6186 Zenon ||  || Zeno of Elea (c. 495–430 BC), Ancient Greek philosopher and mathematician, known for Zeno's paradoxes || 
|-id=187
| 6187 Kagura ||  || The Kagura is a Shinto theatrical dance, that has been performed in sacred places and on special occasions for a thousand years in Japan || 
|-id=188
| 6188 Robertpepin ||  || Robert Pepin (born 1933), American meteoriticist and professor at the University of Minnesota || 
|-id=189
| 6189 Völk ||  || Elisabeth Völk, secretary of ESO headquarters || 
|-id=190
| 6190 Rennes ||  || The French city of Rennes || 
|-id=191
| 6191 Eades ||  || George Eades, a structural engineer, microscopist and member of the British Astronomical Association || 
|-id=192
| 6192 Javiergorosabel ||  || Javier Gorosabel (1969–2015) was a Spanish astronomer, born in the Basque Country. His contributions to the study of \gamma -ray bursts were crucial for the development of that field. He was an eager popularizer of astronomy. || 
|-id=193
| 6193 Manabe ||  || Yoshinosuke or Ryōnosuke Manabe (1926–1983), Japanese orbit computer at Tokyo Astronomical Observatory || 
|-id=194
| 6194 Denali || 1990 TN || Mt. Denali, rising 6194 meters above sea level, is the tallest peak in North America. The name Denali originates from the Tanana Indian language and translates into English as "The Great One". The Tanana Indians are a subgroup of the Athabaskans; the Athabaskans were the original inhabitants of central and south central Alaska. Name proposed by D. Hamilton || 
|-id=195
| 6195 Nukariya ||  || Motoi Nukariya (born 1943), Japanese astronomer and former software development at the Tokyo Astronomical Observatory || 
|-id=196
| 6196 Bernardbowen ||  || Bernard Bowen was the founding chair of the International Centre for Radio Astronomy Research and was instrumental in its establishment in 2009. He helped bring part of the Square Kilometre Array telescope to Western Australia. He has also had a distinguished career in Australian marine science and environmental protection. || 
|-id=197
| 6197 Taracho ||  || Tara is a town in Saga prefecture. The preparation of dried seaweed is its main industry, and Tara mandarin oranges are famous. The Saga Astronomical Society's 0.60-m reflector at the Tara Observatory is familiar to many of the local residents. The name was suggested by Y. Yamada || 
|-id=198
| 6198 Shirakawa ||  || The Japanese city of Shirakawa in Fukushima Prefecture || 
|-id=199
| 6199 Yoshiokayayoi ||  || Yoshioka Yayoi (1871–1959), Japanese physician and women's rights activist || 
|-id=200
| 6200 Hachinohe || 1993 HL || Akio Hachinohe (born 1958), Japanese amateur astronomer on Hokkaido || 
|}

6201–6300 

|-
| 6201 Ichiroshimizu || 1993 HY || Ichiro Shimizu (1923–1996), Japanese astronomer † || 
|-id=202
| 6202 Georgemiley || 3332 T-1 || George K. Miley (born 1942), an Irish-Dutch astronomer || 
|-id=203
| 6203 Lyubamoroz ||  || Lyubov Moroz (born 1966), spectroscopist at the German Aerospace Center in Berlin || 
|-id=204
| 6204 MacKenzie ||  || Norman MacKenzie, a Professor of English at universities in Zimbabwe and Canada || 
|-id=205
| 6205 Menottigalli || 1983 OD || Menotti Galli (born 1922), Italian physicist at University of Bologna || 
|-id=206
| 6206 Corradolamberti ||  || Corrado Lamberti, Italian astronomer; writer and popularizer of astronomy || 
|-id=207
| 6207 Bourvil || 1988 BV || Bourvil (1917–1970), French actor and singer || 
|-id=208
| 6208 Wakata || 1988 XT || Koichi Wakata (born 1963), Japanese astronaut || 
|-id=209
| 6209 Schwaben ||  || Swabia, region in southwest Germany || 
|-id=210
| 6210 Hyunseop ||  || Seo Hyun-seop (born 1944), Korean diplomat †  || 
|-id=211
| 6211 Tsubame || 1991 DO || Tsubame, Japanese former express train running from Tokyo to Osaka or Kobe || 
|-id=212
| 6212 Franzthaler ||  || Franz Thaler (1925–2015) was an author from South Tyrol, Italy and a survivorof Dachau and Hersbruck. Thaler's memoir, Unvergessen (Unforgotten), initiated theprocess of coming to terms with what happened during the Nazi era. He was a firm believer in the peaceful coexistence of the three ethnic groups living in South Tyrol. || 
|-id=213
| 6213 Zwiers || 2196 P-L || Hendrikus Johannes Zwiers (1865–1923), Dutch astronomer at the Leiden Observatory. || 
|-id=214
| 6214 Mikhailgrinev ||  || Mikhail Vasil'evich Grinev (born 1929), outstanding Russian surgeon, director of St. Petersburg Djanelidze Research Institute of Emergency Medicine from 1984 to 1998, member of the board of directors of the European Association of Trauma and Emergency Surgery, professor of St. Petersburg Medical University and medical academy for postgraduate training. Grinev is internationally renowned for his classic research in the field of emergency surgery, polytrauma and shock. Name suggested by the Institute of Applied Astronomy and Djanelidze Research Institute of Emergency Medicine || 
|-id=215
| 6215 Mehdia || 1973 EK || Mehdia, Morocco (Arabic for "gift"), is a region in Morocco with rich natural resources. The forest and the Sidi Boughaba lake are home to thousands of species, including endangered migrating birds from Europe and Sub-Saharan Africa, which prefer to spend the winter in the calm, warm waters of Sidi Boughaba. || 
|-id=216
| 6216 San Jose || 1975 SJ || The city of San Jose in northern California Src || 
|-id=217
| 6217 Kodai || 1975 XH || Kodai Fukushima (born 1991) is a founder of the student club Libertyer. He made the original proposal of the chosen names "Libertas" and "Fortitudo" for the host star Xi Aquilae and its exoplanet Xi Aquilae b in the IAU's NameExoWorlds contest. || 
|-id=218
| 6218 Mizushima ||  || A town of Kurashiki, Okayama, Japan || 
|-id=219
| 6219 Demalia ||  || Aleksandra Alekseevna Demenko (1930–1983), Ukrainian astronomer at Kiev and cometary researcher || 
|-id=220
| 6220 Stepanmakarov ||  || Stepan Makarov (1849–1904), Russian vice-admiral and oceanographer || 
|-id=221
| 6221 Ducentesima || 1980 GO || Latin for "200", for 200th asteroid discovered at Kleť Observatory || 
|-id=223
| 6223 Dahl ||  || Roald Dahl, British author || 
|-id=224
| 6224 El Goresy ||  || Ahmed El Goresy (born 1933), Egyptian mineralogist at the Max-Planck-Institut † || 
|-id=225
| 6225 Hiroko ||  || Hiroko Nagahara (born 1952), Japanese meteoriticist || 
|-id=226
| 6226 Paulwarren ||  || Paul Warren (born 1953), American research geochemist || 
|-id=227
| 6227 Alanrubin ||  || Alan Rubin (born 1953), American research geochemist || 
|-id=228
| 6228 Yonezawa || 1982 BA || Yonezawa, Yamagata, Japan || 
|-id=229
| 6229 Tursachan ||  || Gaelic for "Standing Stones" (1997 Flagstaff Festival of Science asteroid naming contest winner) † || 
|-id=230
| 6230 Fram ||  || Fram, the ship that was built specially for polar research. It was used in expeditions of the Arctic and Antarctic regions by the Norwegian explorers F. Nansen, O. Sverdrup, O. Wisting and R. Amundsen. Fram is preserved at the Fram Museum in Oslo, Norway. || 
|-id=231
| 6231 Hundertwasser || 1985 FH || Friedensreich Hundertwasser (1928–2000), Austrian artist || 
|-id=232
| 6232 Zubitskia ||  || Danila Nikiforovich Zubitskij and Natalia Petrovna Zubitska, doctors and phyto-therapists in Kiev, who have developed original methods of treatment using herbal medicines. The authors of several books, they are well known in the Ukraine, and their methods and preparations are also being used in other countries. Natalia Petrovna, who has a broadcast program in Kiev about herbs and "people's medicine", has also published several books of poetry || 
|-id=233
| 6233 Kimura || 1986 CG || Hisashi Kimura (1870–1943), Japanese astronomer || 
|-id=234
| 6234 Sheilawolfman || 1986 SF || Sheila Wolfman (née Sala Fajerman, 1930–2005), Polish child survivor of the holocaust, pictured in Martin Gilbert's book The Boys || 
|-id=235
| 6235 Burney || 1987 VB || Venetia Burney (1918–2009), English woman who, at age 11, suggested the name Pluto for the "ninth planet" || 
|-id=236
| 6236 Mallard || 1988 WF || LNER Class A4 4468 Mallard, British steam locomotive || 
|-id=237
| 6237 Chikushi || 1989 CV || Chikuzen and Chikugo Province, former name of Fukuoka prefecture, Japan † || 
|-id=238
| 6238 Septimaclark || 1989 NM || Septima Poinsette Clark, (May 3, 1898 – December 15, 1987) was a black American educator and civil rights activist. Clark developed the literacy and citizenship workshops that played an important role in the drive for voting rights and civil rights for African Americans in the Civil Rights Movement || 
|-id=239
| 6239 Minos || 1989 QF || Minos, king of Crete and son of Zeus and Europa || 
|-id=240
| 6240 Lucretius Carus ||  || Titus Lucretius Carus, Roman poet and philosopher † || 
|-id=241
| 6241 Galante || 1989 TG || Maria Pia Galante (born 1916) wife of Ciro Vacchi, owner and director of the San Vittore Observatory in Italy || 
|-id=243
| 6243 Yoder ||  || Charles Finney Yoder (born 1943), American astronomer || 
|-id=244
| 6244 Okamoto || 1990 QF || Hiroshi Okamoto (born 1915), Japanese primary school teacher of discoverer Src || 
|-id=245
| 6245 Ikufumi ||  || Ikufumi Makino, Japanese telecommunications systems engineer and amateur astronomer † || 
|-id=246
| 6246 Komurotoru ||  || Toru Komuro (1899–1953), Japanese sculptor || 
|-id=247
| 6247 Amanogawa ||  || Amanogawa River, Hokkaidō, Japan (In Japanese, "Amanogawa" means also "Milky Way") || 
|-id=249
| 6249 Jennifer ||  || Jennifer Jones (1919–2009), American actress || 
|-id=250
| 6250 Saekohayashi ||  || Saeko S. Hayashi (born 1958) is an associate professor at the National Astronomical Observatory of Japan. || 
|-id=251
| 6251 Setsuko || 1992 DB || Setsuko Akiyama, wife of one of discoverers || 
|-id=252
| 6252 Montevideo ||  || Montevideo, Uruguay, birthplace of Gonzalo Tancredi, one of the discoverers †  || 
|-id=255
| 6255 Kuma || 1994 XT || Kumakōgen, Japanese town on Shikoku and location of the Kuma Kogen Astronomical Observatory || 
|-id=256
| 6256 Canova || 4063 P-L || Antonio Canova (1757–1822), Italian sculptor || 
|-id=257
| 6257 Thorvaldsen || 4098 T-1 || Bertel Thorvaldsen (1768–1844), Danish sculptor || 
|-id=258
| 6258 Rodin || 3070 T-2 || Auguste Rodin (1840–1917), French sculptor || 
|-id=259
| 6259 Maillol || 3236 T-2 || Aristide Maillol (1861–1944), French sculptor || 
|-id=260
| 6260 Kelsey || 1949 PN || Frances Oldham Kelsey (1914–2015), Canadian-American pharmacologist || 
|-id=261
| 6261 Chione || 1976 WC || Chione (daughter of Daedalion) from Greek mythology, mother of Philammon and Autolycus by Apollo and Hermes, respectively || 
|-id=262
| 6262 Javid || 1978 RZ || Huseyn Javid (1882–1941), Azerbaijani poet, playwright and historian || 
|-id=263
| 6263 Druckmüller || 1980 PX || Miloslav Druckmüller (born 1954) is a Czech mathematician, astronomy popularizer and photographer, who developed an innovative method to visualize the solar corona during total eclipses of the Sun. He has stretched the limits of scientific astrophotography, leading to a variety of discoveries. || 
|-id=266
| 6266 Letzel ||  || Jan Letzel, Czech architect || 
|-id=267
| 6267 Rozhen ||  || The Rozhen Observatory (also known as the Bulgarian National Astronomical Observatory) on Mount Rozhen, near Chepelare, Bulgaria || 
|-id=268
| 6268 Versailles ||  || The French city of Versailles, known for its Château de Versailles and the gardens of Versailles, || 
|-id=269
| 6269 Kawasaki || 1990 UJ || Shun'ichi Kawasaki (1896–1943), Japanese astronomer || 
|-id=270
| 6270 Kabukuri || 1991 BD || Kabukuri-numa is a marsh in Miyagi prefecture in northeastern Japan || 
|-id=271
| 6271 Farmer || 1991 NF || Crofton Bernard Farmer, researcher in Earth and planetary atmospheres, visiting scientist at JPL, awardee of the NASA Exceptional Scientific Achievement Medal, and of crucial assistance to the Near-Earth Asteroid Tracking program || 
|-id=273
| 6273 Kiruna ||  || Kiruna, northernmost city of Sweden †  || 
|-id=274
| 6274 Taizaburo || 1992 FV || Taizaburo Koyama (1927–), Japanese astrophotographer and inventor of the "Sky Memo", a portable automatic equatorial telescope || 
|-id=275
| 6275 Kiryu || 1993 VQ || Kiryū, Gunma, Japan || 
|-id=276
| 6276 Kurohone || 1994 AB || The Japanese village of Kurohone, located in Seta District of Gunma Prefecture || 
|-id=277
| 6277 Siok ||  || Steve (born 1949) and Kathy (born 1949) Siok have been members of the Skyscrapers astronomy club of Rhode Island, USA for more than forty years, during which time they have held a variety of leadership positions || 
|-id=278
| 6278 Ametkhan || 1971 TF || Amet-khan Sultan (1920–1971), Soviet test pilot and Tatar air ace during World War II || 
|-id=280
| 6280 Sicardy || 1980 RJ || Bruno Sicardy (born 1958), French professor of astronomy at Pierre and Marie Curie University in Paris, and researcher in Solar System dynamics || 
|-id=281
| 6281 Strnad || 1980 SD || Antonín Strnad (1747–1799), Czech astronomer || 
|-id=282
| 6282 Edwelda ||  || Edwin Aguirre and Imelda Joson, Filipino associate editor and photo editor, respectively, at Sky & Telescope magazine † ‡ + || 
|-id=284
| 6284 Borisivanov ||  || Boris Ivanov (born 1948), Russian geophysicist || 
|-id=285
| 6285 Ingram ||  || Vernon Ingram (1924–2006), German American biologist, and his wife Elizabeth Ingram (born 1940), former Ashdown House housemasters at MIT † || 
|-id=287
| 6287 Lenham || 1984 AR || Alan Pennell Lenham (1930–1996), British amateur astronomer and research scientist at the Royal College of Science in Shrivenham || 
|-id=288
| 6288 Fouts ||  || Gary Arnold Fouts (born 1951) an American astronomer and Professor of Astronomy at Santa Monica College || 
|-id=289
| 6289 Lanusei ||  || Lanusei, a town in Sardinia, Italy. || 
|-id=291
| 6291 Renzetti ||  || Nicholas A. Renzetti (born 1914), physicist, at one time with the Deep Space Network || 
|-id=293
| 6293 Oberpfalz ||  || Upper Palatinate, district in Bavaria, Germany || 
|-id=294
| 6294 Czerny ||  || Karl Czerny, Austrian composer and piano teacher † || 
|-id=295
| 6295 Schmoll ||  || Antoine Schmoll, German piano teacher † || 
|-id=296
| 6296 Cleveland || 1988 NC || Cleveland, city in the U.S. state of Ohio || 
|-id=298
| 6298 Sawaoka || 1988 XC || Akira Sawaoka (born 1938), a Japanese scientist who synthesized a new type of polycrystalline diamond by a new shock-wave consolidation technique. || 
|-id=299
| 6299 Reizoutoyoko ||  || Reizou and Toyoko Mori, parents of one of discoverers || 
|-id=300
| 6300 Hosamu || 1988 YB || Osamu Hioki, friend of discoverers || 
|}

6301–6400 

|-
| 6301 Bohumilruprecht ||  || Bohumil Ruprecht (born 1944), a Czech astronomer, telescope maker and science popularizer from Pardubice, where he co-founded the Baron Arthur Kraus Observatory in 1992 (Src). || 
|-id=302
| 6302 Tengukogen || 1989 CF || Tengu Highland (Tengu Kōgen) is located on the western slope of the Shikoku Mountains on the Shikoku Island, Japan. || 
|-id=304
| 6304 Josephus Flavius ||  || Josephus (c. 37–100), Romano-Jewish historian born in Jerusalem whose records give insight into Early Christianity || 
|-id=305
| 6305 Helgoland ||  || Heligoland, a German island in the North Sea || 
|-id=306
| 6306 Nishimura ||  || Yūji Nishimura (born 1946), a Japanese entrepreneur and president of the optical telescope manufacturer Nishimura Mfg. Co. || 
|-id=307
| 6307 Maiztegui ||  || Alberto Maiztegui (1920–2018), Argentinian author and science educator (Src). || 
|-id=308
| 6308 Ebisuzaki || 1990 BK || Toshikazu Ebisuzaki (born 1958) is a Japanese astronomer and director of the computational astrophysics laboratory at Riken, a scientific research institute in Japan (Src). || 
|-id=309
| 6309 Elsschot ||  || Willem Elsschot (1882–1960), Flemish–Belgian writer || 
|-id=310
| 6310 Jankonke || 1990 KK || Janis L. Konke, an American space advocate and friend of astronomer Eleanor F. Helin, who discovered this minor planet. || 
|-id=311
| 6311 Porubčan ||  || Vladimír Porubčan (born 1940), Slovak astronomer || 
|-id=312
| 6312 Robheinlein ||  || Robert A. Heinlein (1907–1988), American science fiction author || 
|-id=313
| 6313 Tsurutani ||  || Bruce Tsurutani (born 1941) has made essential contributions to original research and technical leadership in space science activities for many NASA, NASA-ESA and Japanese space missions. His research activities include instabilities and turbulence in space plasmas, space weather and astrophysical plasmas. || 
|-id=314
| 6314 Reigber ||  || Christoph Reigber (born 1939) has made essential contributions to the determination of the global gravity field using satellite observations, to the study of Earth kinematics using satellites, to atmospheric sounding using radio-occultation techniques, and to the development and operation of satellite missions. || 
|-id=315
| 6315 Barabash || 1990 TS || Stanislav Barabash (born 1964) has made essential contributions to the measurement and understanding of energetic neutral particles around the Earth and the nearest planets, as well as in the boundary regions of the heliosphere. || 
|-id=316
| 6316 Méndez ||  || Mariano Méndez (born 1960) has had a productive scientific career as an astronomer in parallel with his tireless activity aimed at helping the advancement of education and science in developing countries, notably as Vice Chair (2006–2010) and then Chair (2010–2018) of the COSPAR Panel on Capacity Building. || 
|-id=317
| 6317 Dreyfus ||  || Dreyfus affair, a political scandal that divided France from 1894 to 1906 || 
|-id=318
| 6318 Cronkite || 1990 WA || Walter Cronkite (1916–2009), American TV newsreader || 
|-id=319
| 6319 Beregovoj ||  || Georgy Beregovoy (1921–1995), Russian cosmonaut || 
|-id=320
| 6320 Bremen ||  || Bremen, a Hanseatic city in northwestern Germany || 
|-id=321
| 6321 Namuratakao || 1991 BV || Takao Namura (born 1937), a Japanese telescope-mirror maker including the one for the National Astronomical Observatory of Japan || 
|-id=323
| 6323 Karoji ||  || Hiroshi Karoji, Japanese astronomer. || 
|-id=324
| 6324 Kejonuma ||  || Kejo-numa, a marsh in Miyagi prefecture, is a great wintering site for migratory birds. More than 2000 Bean geese, which are an endangered species in Japan, winter there every year. The marsh was designated as a wetland under the Ramsar Convention in 2008. The name was suggested by T. Yusa || 
|-id=326
| 6326 Idamiyoshi ||  || Miyoshi Ida (born 1953), Japanese amateur astronomer. || 
|-id=327
| 6327 Tijn ||  || Tijn Kolsteren from the Netherlands, who, at age 6 and diagnosed with an incurable brain tumor, raised over 2 million euros for the International Red Cross, as part of the Dutch charity radio program Serious Request 2016 || 
|-id=329
| 6329 Hikonejyo ||  || Hikone Castle, a Japanese Edo-period castle in the city of Hikone || 
|-id=330
| 6330 Koen || 1992 FN || Koen Yanagiya (born 1954), a Japanese professional comic story teller, known as rakugoka. || 
|-id=332
| 6332 Vorarlberg ||  || Vorarlberg, the westernmost federal state of Austria || 
|-id=333
| 6333 Helenejacq || 1992 LG || Helene Jacquelin, mother of American discoverer Gregory J. Leonard || 
|-id=334
| 6334 Robleonard || 1992 MM || Robert David Leonard Sr, father of American discoverer Gregory J. Leonard || 
|-id=335
| 6335 Nicolerappaport || 1992 NR || Nicole Rappaport (born 1950), a senior research scientist at the Jet Propulsion Laboratory, is an authority on radio science and the use of spacecraft tracking data to determine the masses and gravity fields for the natural satellites. She has also done important work on the dynamics of Saturn's ring particles || 
|-id=336
| 6336 Dodo || 1992 UU || Dodo, a large, flightless bird first discovered in 1507 on the island of Mauritius. || 
|-id=337
| 6337 Shiota ||  || Kazuo Shiota (born 1949), Japanese amateur astronomer. || 
|-id=338
| 6338 Isaosato ||  || Isao Satō (born 1963), Japanese astronomer and discoverer of minor planets || 
|-id=339
| 6339 Giliberti || 1993 SG || Giuseppina Giliberti (born 1947), wife of Italian discoverer Silvano Casulli || 
|-id=340
| 6340 Kathmandu ||  || Kathmandu, the capital city of Nepal || 
|-id=345
| 6345 Hideo ||  || Hideo Fukushima (born 1953), Japanese astronomer and discoverer of minor planets || 
|-id=346
| 6346 Syukumeguri || 1995 AY || A part of Kurohone, Gunma, Japan. || 
|-id=349
| 6349 Acapulco ||  || The city of Acapulco on the Pacific coast of Mexico || 
|-id=350
| 6350 Schlüter || 3526 P-L || Andreas Schlüter (1659–1714)), German baroque sculptor and architect || 
|-id=351
| 6351 Neumann || 4277 T-1 || Balthasar Neumann (1687–1753), German baroque architect || 
|-id=352
| 6352 Schlaun || 2400 T-3 || Johann Conrad Schlaun (1695–1773), German baroque architect || 
|-id=353
| 6353 Semper || 3107 T-3 || Gottfried Semper (1803–1873), a German architect || 
|-id=354
| 6354 Vangelis || 1934 GA || Vangelis (1943–2022), Greek composer and multi-instrumentalist Src || 
|-id=355
| 6355 Univermoscow ||  || The Lomonosov Moscow State University || 
|-id=356
| 6356 Tairov || 1976 QR || Vasilij Egorovich Tairov (1859–1938), Russian viticulturist and oenologist || 
|-id=357
| 6357 Glushko ||  || Valentin Glushko (1908–1989), Soviet rocket scientist || 
|-id=358
| 6358 Chertok ||  || Boris Chertok (1912–2011), Russian rocket scientist (specialist in guidance and control) || 
|-id=359
| 6359 Dubinin ||  || Yuri Dubinin (1930–2013), Russian Soviet-era diplomat, scientist, author and translator of several books from the French || 
|-id=361
| 6361 Koppel ||  || Thomas Koppel (1944–2006), a Danish musician. || 
|-id=362
| 6362 Tunis || 1979 KO || Tunis, the capital and the largest city of Tunisia || 
|-id=363
| 6363 Doggett ||  || LeRoy E. Doggett (1941–1996), American astronomer and historian of astronomy  || 
|-id=364
| 6364 Casarini || 1981 ET || Jeannine Casarini, French teacher, member of the Tunguska99 scientific expedition to Central Siberia || 
|-id=365
| 6365 Nickschneider ||  || Nick Schneider (born 1956), American astronomer who pioneered observing mutual occultation and eclipsing events || 
|-id=366
| 6366 Rainerwieler ||  || Rainer Wieler (born 1949), Swiss geochemist at the Swiss Federal Institute of Technology || 
|-id=368
| 6368 Richardmenendez ||  || Richard Menendez (born 1957) has taught astronomy at St. Louis Community College for the last 14 years with his own curriculum aimed toward concepts and ideas for classroom teachers. He has done over 900 hours of public-outreach astronomy and has been a board member of the St. Louis Astronomical Society. || 
|-id=370
| 6370 Malpais || 1984 EY || Spanish for "bad country"/"badlands", used by early explorers of the American Southwest to designate difficult-going countryside strewn with rough lava flows or rocks, and now used to designate the rock found in such country, used for stone building construction (1999 Flagstaff Festival of Science asteroid naming contest winner) † || 
|-id=371
| 6371 Heinlein || 1985 GS || Dieter Heinlein (born 1958), meteorite and tektite collector for the Bavarian Meteorite Laboratory †‡ || 
|-id=372
| 6372 Walker ||  || Robert M. Walker (1929–2004), American meteoricist at Washington University. He was a leading figure in the study of radiation damage in solids and in the investigation of interstellar grains recovered from meteorites. His work on fission tracks with others opened a new approach to the dating of rocks on the earth and the moon and led to new information on the energy spectrum, composition and flux of solar and galactic cosmic rays. He founded whole new methods of scientific study and created a premier center for research in these new fields at Washington University, where he has provided inspiring leadership to a host of students and post-doctoral fellows. || 
|-id=373
| 6373 Stern || 1986 EZ || Alan Stern (born 1957), American astronomer || 
|-id=374
| 6374 Beslan ||  || The Russian town of Beslan || 
|-id=375
| 6375 Fredharris ||  || Frederick Harlan Harris, engineer and expert in CCD photometry at Caltech and Palomar, and was later involved in the Sloan Digital Sky Survey. || 
|-id=376
| 6376 Schamp ||  || Larry and Becky Schamp, Americans stationed in Alice Springs, Australia, who took in members of the Shoemaker family after the car collision in which Eugene died || 
|-id=377
| 6377 Cagney ||  || James Cagney (1899–1986), American actor || 
|-id=379
| 6379 Vrba ||  || Karel Vrba (1845–1922), Czech mineralogy professor || 
|-id=380
| 6380 Gardel || 1988 CG || Carlos Gardel (1890–1935), a singer, composer and actor who recorded during his lifetime hundreds of songs and composed together with Alfredo Le Pera famous tangos such as Mi Buenos Aires querido, Volver or Por una cabeza. The name was suggested by W. A. Fröger || 
|-id=381
| 6381 Toyama ||  || Miyuki Toyama (born 1953), Japanese amateur astronomer and illustrator || 
|-id=383
| 6383 Tokushima ||  || Tokushima-Kainan Astronomical Observatory, located in the Tokushima Prefecture, Japan, owned by the first discover, Masayuki Iwamoto. || 
|-id=384
| 6384 Kervin || 1989 AM || Paul W. Kervin, American scientist and head of the AMOS research station at Haleakala Observatory on Maui, Hawaii || 
|-id=385
| 6385 Martindavid ||  || Martin Alois David (1757–1836), Czech astronomer and observatory director || 
|-id=386
| 6386 Keithnoll ||  || Keith Noll (born 1958), American astronomer discoverer of numerous trans-Neptunian binaries || 
|-id=389
| 6389 Ogawa || 1990 BX || Shigeo Ogawa (born 1932), president of Seibundo-Shinkosha (publisher) || 
|-id=390
| 6390 Hirabayashi ||  || Shigeto Hirabayashi (born 1953), Japanese amateur astronomer || 
|-id=391
| 6391 Africano ||  || John L. Africano (1951–2006), astronomer with the AMOS research station at Haleakala Observatory on Maui, Hawaii || 
|-id=392
| 6392 Takashimizuno || 1990 HR || Takashi Mizuno (born 1955), Japanese amateur astronomer || 
|-id=395
| 6395 Hilliard ||  || Elizabeth Hilliard (1904–) and Leslie Hilliard (1905–), the donators of what is now the Herschel Museum of Astronomy in Bath, England || 
|-id=396
| 6396 Schleswig ||  || Schleswig, the most northern state of Germany || 
|-id=398
| 6398 Timhunter ||  || Tim Hunter, American amateur astronomer || 
|-id=399
| 6399 Harada || 1991 GA || Shoji Harada (born 1953), Japanese amateur astronomer Src || 
|-id=400
| 6400 Georgealexander ||  || George Alexander, a public-affairs manager in Jet Propulsion Laboratory.  || 
|}

6401–6500 

|-
| 6401 Roentgen ||  || Wilhelm Röntgen (1845–1923), German physicist and Nobelist || 
|-id=402
| 6402 Holstein ||  || Holstein, southern part of the German state of Schleswig-Holstein || 
|-id=403
| 6403 Steverin || 1991 NU || Steven Newburn and Erin Fischer on the occasion of their marriage. Steven is the son of Ray Newburn, science coordinator for near-Earth objects at the Jet Propulsion Laboratory and former co-leader of the International Halley Watch || 
|-id=404
| 6404 Vanavara ||  || Vanavara, town in Siberia near the Tunguska impact site Src || 
|-id=405
| 6405 Komiyama || 1992 HJ || Fukuji Komiyama (born 1924), a Japanese agriculture and forestry technician. || 
|-id=406
| 6406 Mikejura || 1992 MJ || Michael Jura (1947–2016) was as an American astronomer and UCLA professor whose work on polluted white dwarfs first enabled the measurement of the chemical compositions of extrasolar asteroids. || 
|-id=408
| 6408 Saijo ||  || Yoshihiro Saijo (born 1959), Japanese amateur astronomer || 
|-id=410
| 6410 Fujiwara ||  || Masahito Fujiwara (1960–1997), Japanese amateur astronomer who contributed to the popularization of astronomy. || 
|-id=411
| 6411 Tamaga || 1993 TA || The Astronomer (TA), a British amateur astronomy magazine, founded under the name The Casual Astronomer by James Muirden in 1964. The interest of the discoverer, Robert H. McNaught, in observational astronomy was spurred by this astronomy magazine. || 
|-id=412
| 6412 Kaifu ||  || Norio Kaifu (1943–2019), Japanese astronomer and first director of the 8.2-meter Subaru Telescope in Hawaii || 
|-id=413
| 6413 Iye ||  || Masanori Iye (born 1949), Japanese astronomer and professor at the National Astronomical Observatory of Japan. He led the engineering core team that designed and manufactured the Subaru Telescope. Iye researches the structure and evolution of galaxies. || 
|-id=414
| 6414 Mizunuma || 1993 UX || A part of Kurohone, Gunma, Japan || 
|-id=416
| 6416 Nyukasayama ||  || Mount Nyūkasa, a mountain in central Japan. || 
|-id=417
| 6417 Liberati || 1993 XA || Libero Liberati (1926–1962), motorcyclist who won the Absolute Italian Championship in 1955 and 1956 riding a four-cylinder Gilera. || 
|-id=418
| 6418 Hanamigahara || 1993 XJ || Hanamigahara, a beautiful forest park in the northern part of Kurohone village, Gunma prefecture. || 
|-id=419
| 6419 Susono || 1993 XX || The Japanese city of Susono, Shizuoka in eastern Shizuoka Prefecture. The city is located near the discoverers' observing site at Mishima || 
|-id=420
| 6420 Riheijyaya ||  || Riheijyaya, a beautiful forest park in the western part of Kurohone village, Gunma prefecture. || 
|-id=422
| 6422 Akagi ||  || Mount Akagi, 1828 m above sea level, is a large stratovolcano in the mid-eastern part of Gunma prefecture. || 
|-id=423
| 6423 Harunasan ||  || Mount Haruna, 1449 m above sea level, and one of the Three Jomo Mountains, is located in the central part of Gunma prefecture || 
|-id=424
| 6424 Ando ||  || Hiroyasu Ando (born 1946), Japanese astronomer and chairman of the Optical and Infrared Astronomy Division of the National Astronomical Observatory of Japan who is an expert in stellar oscillations and high-resolution spectroscopy. || 
|-id=426
| 6426 Vanýsek || 1995 ED || Vladimír Vanýsek (born 1926), a Czech astronomer and professor emeritus of astrophysics at Charles University in Prague. || 
|-id=428
| 6428 Barlach || 3513 P-L || Ernst Barlach (1870–1938), German sculptor, graphic artist and poet || 
|-id=429
| 6429 Brancusi || 4050 T-1 || Constantin Brâncuși (1876–1957), Romanian sculptor || 
|-id=432
| 6432 Temirkanov ||  || Yuri Temirkanov (born 1938), Russian conductor || 
|-id=433
| 6433 Enya || 1978 WC || Enya (Eithne Ní Bhraonáin; born 1961), Irish singer and songwriter Src || 
|-id=434
| 6434 Jewitt || 1981 OH || David C. Jewitt (born 1958), British astronomer and discoverer of minor planets || 
|-id=435
| 6435 Daveross || 1984 DA || David Justin Ross (born 1949), co-developer of the Prime Rib curve, a graphical display of energy requirements for rendezvous trajectories. || 
|-id=436
| 6436 Coco ||  || Mark Coco, an author of astronomical articles and an active observer, and his family || 
|-id=437
| 6437 Stroganov ||  || The Stroganov family of Russia, who exploited the iron and gold mines of the Urals || 
|-id=438
| 6438 Suárez ||  || Buenaventura Suárez (1678–1750) Argentine Jesuit and astronomer who observed the eclipses of Jupiter's satellites. || 
|-id=439
| 6439 Tirol || 1988 CV || Tyrol, federal state in western Austria || 
|-id=440
| 6440 Ransome ||  || Arthur Ransome (1884–1967), British novelist || 
|-id=441
| 6441 Milenajesenská ||  || Milena Jesenská (1896–1944), Czech journalist || 
|-id=442
| 6442 Salzburg ||  || Salzburg, state in Austria || 
|-id=443
| 6443 Harpalion ||  || Harpalion, from Greek mythology. He was the son of King Pylaemenes, a Trojan ally. Harpalion was killed by Meriones, while his father was killed by Menelaus during the Trojan War. || 
|-id=444
| 6444 Ryuzin || 1989 WW || Ryuzin, a small town within Toyota city, Aichi prefecture, Japan || 
|-id=445
| 6445 Bellmore ||  || Tamara Bell and Michael More on the occasion of their wedding. They are recent graduates of the University of Arizona with degrees in political science and geology. The discoverer and her husband wish the newlyweds a harmonious marriage and rewarding careers. || 
|-id=446
| 6446 Lomberg || 1990 QL || Jon Lomberg (born 1948), American space artist and science journalist || 
|-id=447
| 6447 Terrycole ||  || Terry Cole, chief technologist at the Jet Propulsion Laboratory and senior faculty associate in the Caltech Division of Chemistry and Chemical Engineering. || 
|-id=449
| 6449 Kudara ||  || Kyoyu Kudara (1894–1964), Japanese astronomer, second president of Oriental Astronomical Association || 
|-id=450
| 6450 Masahikohayashi ||  || Masahiko Hayashi (born 1959), professor of astronomy at the Department of Astronomy of the University of Tokyo || 
|-id=451
| 6451 Kärnten ||  || Carinthia, the southernmost province of Austria || 
|-id=452
| 6452 Johneuller || 1991 HA || John E. Euller, American physics teacher at Eastridge High School in Irondequoit, New York || 
|-id=456
| 6456 Golombek || 1992 OM || Matthew P. Golombek, American planetary geologist || 
|-id=457
| 6457 Kremsmünster || 1992 RT || The town of Kremsmünster and its Benedictine monastery, in Upper Austria, where the Kremsmünster observatory is located || 
|-id=458
| 6458 Nouda ||  || Tadasuke Nouda (1901–1989), Japanese astronomer Src || 
|-id=459
| 6459 Hidesan ||  || Hideo Sato (born 1940), Japanese astronomer || 
|-id=460
| 6460 Bassano ||  || Bassano Bresciano, an ancient village in northern Italy, where the Bassano Bresciano Observatory is located || 
|-id=461
| 6461 Adam ||  || Robert Adam (1728–1792), a Scottish architect || 
|-id=462
| 6462 Myougi ||  || Mount Myougi, 1104 m above sea level, one of the "Three Jomo Mountains" was created by volcanic activity. It is located at the southwestern part of Gunma prefecture, Japan. || 
|-id=463
| 6463 Isoda ||  || Sachiko Isoda (1912–1993), a Japanese astronomer who joined the Tokyo Astronomical Observatory in 1943 || 
|-id=464
| 6464 Kaburaki || 1994 CK || Masaki Kaburaki (1902–1987), a professor of astronomy at the University of Tokyo until 1963 || 
|-id=465
| 6465 Zvezdotchet || 1995 EP || Zvezdotchet ("Stargazer"), a Russian magazine for amateur astronomers || 
|-id=466
| 6466 Drewesquivel ||  || Drew Esquivel (1995–2016), a devoted student, mentor, leader, and outstanding athlete on wrestling and swimming teams, enjoyed sharing his skills and passion for software development with his peers at MIT and the Summer Science Program, and with the community at large via mobile applications and online tutoring. || 
|-id=467
| 6467 Prilepina ||  || Svetlana Semenovna Prilepina, a Russian astronomer who graduate at the Ural State University. She has been organizing the annual Winter Astronomical School at the Kourovka Astronomical Observatory. || 
|-id=468
| 6468 Welzenbach ||  || Linda Welzenbach (born 1966), American geologist, Collection Manager of the Meteorite Collection of the National Museum of Natural History || 
|-id=469
| 6469 Armstrong || 1982 PC || Neil Armstrong (1930–2012), American astronaut and first person to walk on the Moon with the Apollo 11 || 
|-id=470
| 6470 Aldrin ||  || Buzz Aldrin (born 1930), American astronaut and second person to walk on the Moon with the Apollo 11 || 
|-id=471
| 6471 Collins ||  || Michael Collins (1930–2021), American astronaut of the Apollo 11 mission || 
|-id=472
| 6472 Rosema || 1985 TL || Keith D. Rosema (born 1967), computer scientist at the Jet Propulsion Laboratory who did asteroid radar astronomy at both Arecibo and Goldstone Observatory || 
|-id=473
| 6473 Winkler || 1986 GM || Ron Winkler (born 1954), American digital engineer and radio astronomer at Goldstone Observatory || 
|-id=474
| 6474 Choate ||  || Dennis Choate (born 1952), senior engineer at NASA's Goldstone Observatory || 
|-id=475
| 6475 Refugium ||  || Latin word for "refuge" || 
|-id=478
| 6478 Gault ||  || Donald Gault (1923–1999), an American planetary geologist and giant in the field of impact cratering processes, who applied his understanding and insight as an experimentalist to interpreting impact data and its application to the Moon, the Earth, Mars and Mercury. His work is at the heart of the most basic of all processes concerned with solid bodies in the Solar System. || 
|-id=479
| 6479 Leoconnolly || 1988 LC || Leo P. Connolly, American astronomer and teacher at California State University || 
|-id=480
| 6480 Scarlatti ||  || Domenico Scarlatti (1685–1757), Italian composer and instrumentalist || 
|-id=481
| 6481 Tenzing ||  || Tenzing Norgay (known as Sherpa Tenzing, 1914–1986), a Nepali-Indian Sherpa mountaineer who reached the summit of Mount Everest with Edmund Hillary in 1953 || 
|-id=482
| 6482 Steiermark ||  || The state of Styria in southeast Austria || 
|-id=483
| 6483 Nikolajvasilʹev ||  || Nikolaj Vasilʹev, Russian scientific director of the Interdisciplinary Independent Tunguska Expeditions Src || 
|-id=484
| 6484 Barthibbs ||  || Bart Hibbs, American physicist and long-time acquaintance of the discoverer Eleanor Helin || 
|-id=485
| 6485 Wendeesther ||  || Wendee Esther Wallach-Feldman (afterwards Wendee Wallach-Levy), former teacher. Married to astronomer David H. Levy with whom she co-directs their private observatory (Jarnac Observatory) in Vail, Arizona || 
|-id=486
| 6486 Anitahill || 1991 FO || Anita Hill, (born 1956) American lawyer, academic and human rights advocate. She became a national figure in 1991 when she accused U.S. Supreme Court nominee Clarence Thomas, her supervisor at the United States Department of Education and the Equal Employment Opportunity Commission, of sexual harassment and inspired generations of women to speak out against harassment. || 
|-id=487
| 6487 Tonyspear ||  || Tony Spear, American engineer, latterly of the Jet Propulsion Laboratory || 
|-id=488
| 6488 Drebach ||  || Drebach Observatory  and planetarium in Germany || 
|-id=489
| 6489 Golevka || 1991 JX || The international collaboration of the Goldstone Observatory, Yevpatoria and Kashima Space Communication Center || 
|-id=493
| 6493 Cathybennett || 1992 CA || Catherine A. Bennett, who was instrumental for the establishment of a successful NEO detection system at JPL || 
|-id=496
| 6496 Kazuko ||  || Kazuko Ōtsuka (born 1934), Japanese Astronomer at the Tokyo Astronomical Observatory since 1957 || 
|-id=497
| 6497 Yamasaki ||  || Masamitsu Yamasaki (1886–1959), Japanese astronomer Src || 
|-id=498
| 6498 Ko ||  || Ko Nagasawa (born 1932), worker at the University of Tokyo's Earthquake Research Institute and the Public Information Office at the National Astronomical Observatory of Japan. || 
|-id=499
| 6499 Michiko ||  || Michiko Hirasawa (born 1955), wife of the co-discoverer Masanori Hirasawa || 
|-id=500
| 6500 Kodaira || 1993 ET || Keiichi Kodaira (born 1937), Japanese astronomer and (first) scientific director of the Subaru Telescope on Hawaii || 
|}

6501–6600 

|-
| 6501 Isonzo || 1993 XD || The river Soča. The Italian village of Farra d'Isonzo and its Farra d'Isonzo Observatory  are located nearby. || 
|-id=504
| 6504 Lehmbruck || 4630 P-L || Wilhelm Lehmbruck (1881–1919), German sculptor || 
|-id=505
| 6505 Muzzio || 1976 AH || Juan Carlos Muzzio (born 1946), Argentine astrophysicist and a discoverer of minor planets || 
|-id=506
| 6506 Klausheide ||  || Klaus Heide (born 1938), German meteorite and tektite researcher at the University of Jena || 
|-id=508
| 6508 Rolčík || 1982 QM || Viktor Rolčík (1884–1954), Czech optician and telescope maker || 
|-id=509
| 6509 Giovannipratesi ||  || Giovanni Pratesi (born 1963) is a mineralogist and specialist in meteorites and impact rocks. He is director of the Museum of Natural History of the University of Firenze and was the founder and director of the Museum of Planetary Sciences in Prato until 2012. || 
|-id=510
| 6510 Tarry || 1987 DF || William and Nancy Tarry, Americans stationed in Alice Springs, Australia, who provided hospitality and assistance to the Shoemakers when Eugene was killed in an outback car collision || 
|-id=511
| 6511 Furmanov ||  || Rudol'f Davidovich Furmanov (born 1938), Russian producer and artist from Saint Petersburg, Russia || 
|-id=512
| 6512 de Bergh ||  || Catherine de Bergh (born 1945), French planetary scientist at the Paris Observatory who has studied the chemistry of the giant and terrestrial planets. She also studied in the icy surfaces of Io, Triton and Pluto. || 
|-id=514
| 6514 Torahiko || 1987 WY || Torahiko Terada (1878–1935), Japanese physicist and author || 
|-id=515
| 6515 Giannigalli || 1988 MG || Gianni Galli (born 1963), Italian amateur astronomer || 
|-id=516
| 6516 Gruss ||  || Gustav Gruss (1854–1922), Czech astronomer || 
|-id=517
| 6517 Buzzi || 1990 BW || Luca Buzzi (born 1982), Italian amateur astronomer and discoverer of minor planets || 
|-id=518
| 6518 Vernon || 1990 FR || Robert and Esther Vernon, longtime friends and, for more than 35 years, neighbors of the discoverer and her parents, Fred and Kay Francis. Their wise counsel, advice and solace over the years have been a source of comfort and renewed strength. Bob, now "retired", travels the world from Slovakia to Mongolia, sharing his wealth of experience and expertise with emerging democracies || 
|-id=519
| 6519 Giono ||  || Jean Giono (1895–1970), French writer || 
|-id=520
| 6520 Sugawa || 1991 HH || Chikara Sugawa (1916–), Japanese astronomer with the International Latitude Observatory in Mizusawa || 
|-id=521
| 6521 Pina ||  || Pina Toscano Blanco, regular "accompanying person" at astronomical meetings during the last 25 years. Her continuous presence has made her a supporting member of the "wives' committees" that do so much to improve such meetings. Name suggested by Pina's husband, Carlo Blanco, with the blessing of the discoverer || 
|-id=522
| 6522 Aci || 1991 NQ || The Jaci (Aci), a river southeast of Mount Etna, Italy. The name also honors the many towns and villages along it that contain the name: Acicastello, Acitrezza, Acireale, Acibonaccorsi, Acicatena, Aci Sant'Antonio and Aci Santo Filippo. The modern-day river evokes the myth of Aci (or Acis), the young Sicilian shepherd who was in love with Galatea, a Nereid. The jealous cyclops Polyphemus hurled a large rock and killed Aci, whose blood was transformed into an underground river that plunged into the Ionian Sea to hug his beloved Galatea. Name proposed by the discoverer, following a suggestion by Carlo Blanco || 
|-id=523
| 6523 Clube || 1991 TC || Victor Clube (born 1934), English astrophysicist and planetary scientist || 
|-id=524
| 6524 Baalke || 1992 AO || Ron Baalke, American software engineer at JPL || 
|-id=525
| 6525 Ocastron ||  || Orange County Astronomers, a public non-profit organization in southern California || 
|-id=526
| 6526 Matogawa || 1992 TY || Yasunori Matogawa (born 1942), Japanese rocket engineer at the Institute of Space and Astronautical Science in Tokyo || 
|-id=527
| 6527 Takashiito ||  || Takashi Ito (born 1967) is a Japanese planetary scientist who specializes in solar-system dynamics, particularly concerning minor planets. One of his major achievements was to confirm numerically that asymmetric lunar cratering has a profound connection with near-Earth-asteroid dynamics || 
|-id=528
| 6528 Boden ||  || Boden Municipality, Sweden, birthplace of astronomer Mats Lindgren, who co-discovered this minor planet || 
|-id=529
| 6529 Rhoads ||  || R. Rhoads Stephenson, mechanical engineer and deputy director at JPL || 
|-id=530
| 6530 Adry || 1994 GW || Adriano Casulli (born 1974), son of astronomer Vincenzo Silvano Casulli who discovered this minor planet || 
|-id=531
| 6531 Subashiri || 1994 YY || Subashiri, part of Oyama town at the foot of Mount Fuji, Japan || 
|-id=532
| 6532 Scarfe || 1995 AC || Colin D. Scarfe (born 1940), Canadian astronomer and professor of astronomy at the University of Victoria † || 
|-id=533
| 6533 Giuseppina ||  || Josephine Hergenrother (born 1949), mother of American astronomer Carl W. Hergenrother who discovered this minor planet || 
|-id=534
| 6534 Carriepeterson ||  || Carolyn (Carrie) H. Peterson (1942–2006) was an active member of the Astronomical Society of Southern New England (ASSNE). || 
|-id=535
| 6535 Archipenko || 3535 P-L || Alexander Archipenko (1887–1964) Ukrainian-born American sculptor and avant-garde artist || 
|-id=536
| 6536 Vysochinska || 1977 NK || Lyudmila Iosifovna Vysochinska, composer, pianist and music critic in Kiev and a public figure throughout Ukraine. She has written many songs based on the poetry of Ukrainian, Russian and Bulgarian poets. The founding director of the Ukraine's first Theater of Songs, she has research interests that include the connections between Ukrainian classical composers and writers || 
|-id=537
| 6537 Adamovich ||  || Ales Adamovich (1927–1994), Belarusian-Russian writer and a critic || 
|-id=538
| 6538 Muraviov ||  || Mikhail Nikitich Muraviov (1757–1807), Russian poet, minister, and administrator of Moscow State University, where he inaugurated the department of astronomy and built the observatory || 
|-id=539
| 6539 Nohavica || 1982 QG || Jaromír Nohavica (born 1953), Czech singer, poet and composer || 
|-id=540
| 6540 Stepling ||  || Joseph Stepling (1716–1778), Czech Jesuit astronomer who founded the astronomical observatory at the Jesuit college in Prague || 
|-id=541
| 6541 Yuan || 1984 DY || Dah-Ning Yuan (born 1956), a senior scientist at the Jet Propulsion Laboratory, has been a key contributor to the determination of the earth's gravity field using the ultra precise spacecraft-to-spacecraft ranging data from the twin GRACE spacecraft || 
|-id=542
| 6542 Jacquescousteau ||  || Jacques-Yves Cousteau (1910–1997), French marine explorer || 
|-id=543
| 6543 Senna ||  || Ayrton Senna (1960–1994), Brazilian Formula One racing driver || 
|-id=544
| 6544 Stevendick || 1986 SD || Steven J. Dick (born 1949), president of IAU Commission 41 (1997–2000), wrote the official history of the U.S. Naval Observatory and books on the history of the extraterrestrial life debate. At the USNO (1979–2003) he was astronomer, historian and Nautical Almanac Office chief. He has been chief historian of NASA since 2003 || 
|-id=545
| 6545 Leitus ||  || Leitus, an Argonaut from Greek mythology. He was one of the seven Achaean Leaders in front of whom Poseidon appeared during the Trojans' attack on the Greek armada, urging them to fight back instead of acting like cowards. Wounded by Hector, Leitus was one of the few to safely return home after the Trojan War. || 
|-id=546
| 6546 Kaye ||  || Danny Kaye (1911–1987), American actor and comedian || 
|-id=547
| 6547 Vasilkarazin ||  || Vasilij Nazarovich Karazin (1773-1842), Russian/Ukrainian scientist, founder of the University of Kharkov which now bears his name || 
|-id=549
| 6549 Skryabin ||  || Alexander Scriabin (1872–1915), Russian composer || 
|-id=550
| 6550 Parléř ||  || Peter Parler (1333–1399), German-Bohemian architect and sculptor || 
|-id=552
| 6552 Higginson || 1989 GH || George Higginson (1999–2009), of Lancaster, England, killed tragically in a road accident, was a promising student and budding astronomer. The name was suggested by M. A. Thompson || 
|-id=553
| 6553 Seehaus ||  || Paul A. Seehaus (1891–1919), German painter || 
|-id=554
| 6554 Takatsuguyoshida ||  || Takatsugu Yoshida (born 1951), Japanese amateur astronomer || 
|-id=556
| 6556 Arcimboldo ||  || Giuseppe Arcimboldo (1527–1593), Italian painter || 
|-id=557
| 6557 Yokonomura ||  || Yōko Nomura (born 1950), wife of Japanese amateur astronomer Toshiro Nomura who co-discovered this minor planet || 
|-id=558
| 6558 Norizuki || 1991 GZ || Sōjirō Norizuki (1912–1995), Japanese telescope builder who constructed the first parabolic antenna for solar observations in Japan in 1949 || 
|-id=559
| 6559 Nomura || 1991 JP || Toshiro Nomura (born 1954), Japanese science teacher, amateur astronomer and discoverer of minor planets || 
|-id=560
| 6560 Pravdo || 1991 NP || Steven H. Pravdo, American astronomer and co-investigator of the Near-Earth Asteroid Tracking || 
|-id=561
| 6561 Gruppetta ||  || John M. Gruppetta (born 1957), a long-time friend of the discoverer, is a design engineer with an interest in astronomy || 
|-id=562
| 6562 Takoyaki ||  || Takoyaki, Japanese fast food || 
|-id=563
| 6563 Steinheim ||  || The Steinheim crater in southwest Germany. It is approximately 15 million years old and measures 4 kilometers in diameter. || 
|-id=564
| 6564 Asher || 1992 BB || David J. Asher (born 1966), British astronomer and discoverer of minor planets || 
|-id=565
| 6565 Reiji || 1992 FT || Leiji Matsumoto (born 1938), Japanese manga artist || 
|-id=566
| 6566 Shafter ||  || Allen Shafter (born 1955), American professor and chairman of studies in astronomy at San Diego State University || 
|-id=567
| 6567 Shigemasa || 1992 WS || Shigemasa Suzuki (1920–), a Japanese engineer and radiophysicist || 
|-id=568
| 6568 Serendip || 1993 DT || Serendip (Sri Lanka) is one of the names of Sri Lanka. The old Persian name id used in the fairy tale The Three Princes of Serendip, whose heroes are always making discoveries of things they were not seeking. || 
|-id=569
| 6569 Ondaatje || 1993 MO || Michael Ondaatje (born 1943), Sri Lanka-born Canadian novelist, poet and writer, best known for his novel The English Patient || 
|-id=570
| 6570 Tomohiro || 1994 JO || Tomohiro Hirayama (born 1938), Japanese astronomer and software engineer || 
|-id=571
| 6571 Sigmund || 3027 P-L || Peter Sigmund (born 1936), a Danish physicist at Odense University in Denmark University || 
|-id=572
| 6572 Carson || 1938 SX || Rachel Carson (1907–1964), an American marine biologist, conservationist and author, known for her book Silent Spring || 
|-id=573
| 6573 Magnitskij ||  || Leontij Filippovich Magnitskij (1669–1739), a teacher of mathematics at the School of Mathematical and Navigation Sciences in Moscow from 1701, was author of the first printed book in Russia on "arithmetics", an encyclopedia of mathematical and astronomical knowledge at that time || 
|-id=574
| 6574 Gvishiani ||  || Jermen Mikhailovich Gvishiani (born 1928), known for his many works in philosophy, sociology and theory of management. He serves as president of the Foundation for Prospective Research and the Moscow Institute of Economics, Politics and Law. He is a member of the Russian Academy of Sciences, the Rome Club and many foreign academies, foundations and associations. His work promotes the use of foreign achievements in science, technology and culture in present-day Russia || 
|-id=575
| 6575 Slavov ||  || Nikolaj Antonovich Slavov (born 1926), Ukrainian river fleet engineer and sportsman. He helped lead the clean-up effort after the 1986 disaster at Chernobyl, where he had been working for several months. A national boxing champion, he is president of the Professional Boxing League of Ukraine. His interests extend to the arts, and he is president of the All-Ukrainian Foundation for the artist Leonid Bykov. He actively contributes to the development of culture and sport in Ukraine || 
|-id=576
| 6576 Kievtech ||  || The Kiev Polytechnic Institute (Igor Sikorsky Kyiv Polytechnic Institute) || 
|-id=577
| 6577 Torbenwolff ||  || Torben Wolff (born 1919) is a Danish marine biologist who participated in the Galathea Deep-Sea Expedition Round the World (1950–1952) and other major ocean expeditions. || 
|-id=578
| 6578 Zapesotskij ||  || Alexander Sergeevich Zapesotskij (born 1954), Russian culturologist and sociologist || 
|-id=579
| 6579 Benedix ||  || Gretchen K. Benedix (born 1968), British curator of meteorites at the Natural History Museum in London || 
|-id=580
| 6580 Philbland ||  || Philip A. Bland (born 1969), British planetologist and meteoriticist || 
|-id=581
| 6581 Sobers || 1981 SO || Garfield Sobers (born 1936), West Indies cricketer || 
|-id=582
| 6582 Flagsymphony || 1981 VS || The Flagstaff Symphony Orchestra is celebrating its 50th season in 1999–2000. It is considered by many to be the best symphony orchestra in a small community in the U.S.A || 
|-id=583
| 6583 Destinn || 1984 DE || Ema Destinn (1878–1930), Czech opera singer || 
|-id=584
| 6584 Ludekpesek || 1984 FK || Luděk Pešek (1919–1999), Swiss astronomical artist and novelist || 
|-id=585
| 6585 O'Keefe || 1984 SR || John A. O'Keefe, American astronomer, geodesist, and researcher in meteoritics † || 
|-id=586
| 6586 Seydler ||  || August Seydler (1849–1891), Czech astronomer || 
|-id=587
| 6587 Brassens ||  || Georges Brassens (1921–1981), French singer and poet || 
|-id=589
| 6589 Jankovich ||  || Milan Jankovich, economist and ecologist in Monaco, is head of the Zepter company. He is devoted to helping young people, improving the environment and encouraging cultural advances. He has won many prestigious international prizes. The name was suggested by the Ukrainian Ecological Academy of Sciences || 
|-id=590
| 6590 Barolo ||  || Barolo, a winegrowing area in Piedmont, Italy || 
|-id=591
| 6591 Sabinin ||  || Dmitry Anatolievich Sabinin (1889–1951), Russian scientist at Moscow State University || 
|-id=592
| 6592 Goya ||  || Francisco Goya (1746–1828), Spanish painter named on the 250th anniversary of his birth || 
|-id=594
| 6594 Tasman ||  || Abel Tasman (1603–1659), Dutch explorer || 
|-id=595
| 6595 Munizbarreto ||  || Luiz Muniz Barreto, Brazilian astronomer and director of the National Observatory in Rio de Janeiro || 
|-id=596
| 6596 Bittner ||  || Adam Bittner (1777–1844), Austrian astronomer and fifth director of the Klementinum observatory in Prague || 
|-id=597
| 6597 Kreil ||  || Karl Kreil (1798–1862), Austrian astronomer and meteorologist || 
|-id=598
| 6598 Modugno || 1988 CL || Domenico Modugno (1928–1994), an Italian singer, songwriter and actor || 
|-id=599
| 6599 Tsuko || 1988 PV || Tsukō Nakamura (born 1943), Japanese astronomer at the National Astronomical Observatory of Japan || 
|-id=600
| 6600 Qwerty || 1988 QW || The Qwerty standard Roman-alphabet typewriter keyboard (named after the first six of the top row of letters), in part because the provisional designation was QW || 
|}

6601–6700 

|-
| 6601 Schmeer ||  || Patrick Schmeer (born 1964) is an amateur astronomer observing cataclysmic variable stars from Saarbruecken-Bischmisheim, Germany. He detected the 1999 eruption of the recurrent nova U Sco and a number of rare dwarf nova outbursts, and he has identified several putative dwarf novae as minor planets. || 
|-id=602
| 6602 Gilclark || 1989 EC || Gilbert A. Clark, American creator of the "Telescopes in Education" (TIE) program (also see 6695 Barrettduff) || 
|-id=603
| 6603 Marycragg ||  || Mary A. Cragg (born 1938) developed the Telescopes in Education (TIE) office infrastructure. It is used as a model for other remote educational telescope operations || 
|-id=604
| 6604 Ilias ||  || The Iliad, Homer's ancient Greek epic poem about the Trojan War || 
|-id=605
| 6605 Carmontelle ||  || Louis de Carmontelle (1717–1806), a French painter and architect || 
|-id=606
| 6606 Makino || 1990 UF || Tomitaro Makino (1862–1957), Japanese botanist || 
|-id=607
| 6607 Matsushima ||  || Kōichi Matsushima (born 1938), Japanese astronomer at the National Aerospace Laboratory of Japan || 
|-id=608
| 6608 Davidecrespi ||  || Davide Crespi (born 1970), Italian amateur astronomer at the Suno Observatory  || 
|-id=610
| 6610 Burwitz ||  || Vadim Burwitz (born 1965), German astronomer at the Max Planck Institute for Extraterrestrial Physics || 
|-id=612
| 6612 Hachioji ||  || The Japanese city of Hachiōji, near Tokyo, is the birthplace of astronomer Yoshio Kushida, who co-discovered this minor planet || 
|-id=613
| 6613 Williamcarl || 1994 LK || William Carl Hergenrother (born 1946) is the father of American astronomer Carl W. Hergenrother, who discovered this minor planet || 
|-id=614
| 6614 Antisthenes || 6530 P-L || Antisthenes (c. 445–365 BC), Greek philosopher, founder of the Cynic school of philosophy || 
|-id=615
| 6615 Plutarchos || 9512 P-L || Plutarch (c. AD 46–120), Greek historian, biographer, and essayist || 
|-id=616
| 6616 Plotinos || 1175 T-1 || Plotinus (205–270), Greek philosopher and founder of the neo-Platonic philosophy Neoplatonism || 
|-id=617
| 6617 Boethius || 2218 T-1 || Boethius (c. 480–524), Roman senator, consul, philosopher and Christian theologian || 
|-id=618
| 6618 Jimsimons || 1936 SO || Jim Simons (born 1938), an American mathematician and philanthropist. || 
|-id=619
| 6619 Kolya ||  || Nikolai Chernykh (1931–2004), Russian astronomer and discoverer of minor planets || 
|-id=620
| 6620 Peregrina || 1973 UC || Peregrina ("Pilgrim") is a foreign lady, especially one on pilgrimage. The minor planets might be compared to an immense, multifarious crowd of perpetual pilgrims, and this one fancied to be an especially earnest, devout member. || 
|-id=621
| 6621 Timchuk ||  || Evdokiya Ivanovna Timchuk (born 1937), a neuropathologist and physician at a hospital near Simferopol on the Crimean peninsula. She is a good friend of the discoverer Tamara Smirnova. || 
|-id=622
| 6622 Matvienko ||  || Vladimir Pavlovich Matvienko (born 1938), Ukrainian economist, author of many works on economics and banking and a member of the Ukrainian Academy of Ecological Sciences. He is also a poet, and some of his poetic works have been set to music || 
|-id=623
| 6623 Trioconbrio ||  || Trio con Brio Copenhagen is the leading music ensemble in Denmark. The trio was formed in 1999 and consists of Jens Elvekjaer (piano), Soo-Kyung Hong (cello), and Soo-Jin Hong (violin). In addition to their explorations of the core piano trio repertoire, they have won acclaim for their advocacy of contemporary music. || 
|-id=625
| 6625 Nyquist ||  || Laurence E. Nyquist (born 1939), American planetary scientist || 
|-id=626
| 6626 Mattgenge ||  || Matthew Genge (born 1968), British planetary scientist and meteoriticist at Imperial College, London || 
|-id=628
| 6628 Dondelia ||  || Donald and Delia West, English friends of the discoverer Edward L. G. Bowell || 
|-id=629
| 6629 Kurtz || 1982 UP || Paul Kurtz (1925–2012), American professor of philosophy and scientific skeptic of the State University of New York Src || 
|-id=630
| 6630 Skepticus ||  || The Committee for the Scientific Investigation of Claims of the Paranormal (CSICOP), a prominent organization of skeptics Src || 
|-id=631
| 6631 Pyatnitskij ||  || Mitrofan Pyatnitsky (1864–1927), Russian musician and gatherer of folk-songs || 
|-id=632
| 6632 Scoon ||  || George E. N. Scoon (born 1936), Grenadian-born who worked at ESA's Future Scientific Project Division || 
|-id=635
| 6635 Zuber ||  || Maria Zuber (born 1958), American geophysicist and planetary geologist || 
|-id=636
| 6636 Kintanar ||  || Roman Kintanar (1929–2007), Filipino meteorologist, director of PAGASA, the Philippine Atmospheric, Geophysical and Astronomical Services Administration || 
|-id=637
| 6637 Inoue || 1988 XZ || Keisuke Inoue (1928–), Japanese astronomer || 
|-id=639
| 6639 Marchis ||  || Franck Marchis (born 1973), French astronomer and planetary scientist || 
|-id=640
| 6640 Falorni || 1990 DL || Marco Falorni (1944–1995), Italian amateur astronomer and president of the Italian association of amateur astronomers || 
|-id=641
| 6641 Bobross ||  || Robert Ross (born 1920) has devoted his life to the Muscular Dystrophy Association for almost 50 years. Now senior vice president and executive director, Ross has built the MDA into a world-famous organization funding research and opening new avenues for the care of patients and their families || 
|-id=642
| 6642 Henze ||  || Martin Henze (born 1981), German astronomer at the Max Planck Institute for Extraterrestrial Physics || 
|-id=643
| 6643 Morikubo || 1990 VZ || Shigeru Morikubo (1913–), Japanese amateur astronomer and observer of variable stars, sunspots, meteors and occultations. || 
|-id=644
| 6644 Jugaku || 1991 AA || Jun Jugaku (1927–), Japanese astronomer and professor at Tokai University and the Tokyo Astronomical Observatory || 
|-id=645
| 6645 Arcetri ||  || The Italian Arcetri Observatory  was moved in 1872 from the center of the city to Arcetri, near the house in which Galileo died. The original observatory, La Specola, was also associated with Galileo, and nineteenth-century directors included the comet hunters Pons, Donati and Tempel. It was Donati who moved the observatory to its present location. || 
|-id=646
| 6646 Churanta ||  || Antonina Mikhailovna Churyumova (1907–2003) is the mother of astronomer Klim Churyumov. A poet who has participated actively in public issues in the Ukraine, she has seven other children || 
|-id=647
| 6647 Josse ||  || Raymond Josse (1914–), friend of Belgian astronomer Eric Walter Elst, who discovered this minor planet || 
|-id=649
| 6649 Yokotatakao || 1991 RN || Takao Yokota (born 1956), Japanese systems engineer and amateur astronomer || 
|-id=650
| 6650 Morimoto ||  || Masaki Morimoto (born 1932), Japanese radio astronomer || 
|-id=651
| 6651 Rogervenable ||  || Roger Venable (born 1950) is a physician specializing in primary care and emergency medicine. He is Coordinator of Mars Section of Association of Lunar and Planetary Observers, and Vice President of International Occultation Timing Association. Roger has published articles on the atmosphere of Mars. || 
|-id=653
| 6653 Feininger ||  || Lyonel Feininger (1871–1956), a German-American expressionist painter || 
|-id=654
| 6654 Luleå ||  || The Luleå Municipality in northern Sweden and seat of Norrbotten County || 
|-id=655
| 6655 Nagahama ||  || The Japanese city of Nagahama, located in the northeastern part of Shiga prefecture || 
|-id=656
| 6656 Yokota || 1992 FF || Hiroshi Yokota (1927–), Japanese amateur astronomer || 
|-id=657
| 6657 Otukyo || 1992 WY || The Japanese city of Otukyo, now Ōtsu, briefly served as the capital of Japan in the 7th century || 
|-id=658
| 6658 Akiraabe ||  || Akira Abe (born 1934), Japanese editor of the astronomical magazine Hoshino Techo ("Star Handbook") || 
|-id=659
| 6659 Pietsch || 1992 YN || Wolfgang Pietsch (born 1948), German astronomer at the Max Planck Institute for Extraterrestrial Physics || 
|-id=660
| 6660 Matsumoto || 1993 BC || Tatsujiro Matsumoto (born 1930), Japanese telescope maker and observer of Mars and Jupiter || 
|-id=661
| 6661 Ikemura || 1993 BO || Toshihiko Ikemura (born 1952), a Japanese communications technician and amateur astronomer who co-discovered comet 76P/West–Kohoutek–Ikemura in March 1975. He has also endeavored to observe the planets photographically and independently made a map of Mars that is used by many observers. || 
|-id=663
| 6663 Tatebayashi || 1993 CC || The Japanese city of Tatebayashi, located in the eastern part of Gunma Prefecture || 
|-id=664
| 6664 Tennyo || 1993 CK || Tennyō, a female heavenly messenger and spiritual being in Japanese Buddhism || 
|-id=665
| 6665 Kagawa || 1993 CN || Tetsuo Kagawa (born 1969), Japanese astronomer at Gekko Observatory . He is a discoverer of minor planets. || 
|-id=666
| 6666 Frö ||  || Freyr (Frö), from Norse mythology, is the god of fertility and son of Njord || 
|-id=667
| 6667 Sannaimura ||  || The Japanese village of Sannai (Sannaimura) is located in the Akita Prefecture. In Japanese, Sannai means "in the mountains" and mura means "village". || 
|-id=669
| 6669 Obi ||  || Shinya Obi (1925–), Japanese astronomer, professor at the University of Tokyo, and author of popular astronomy books || 
|-id=670
| 6670 Wallach ||  || Annette and Leonard Wallach, American creators of "Treasure Island", a day camp and school on Long Island in New York || 
|-id=671
| 6671 Concari ||  || Paolo Concari (born 1978), an Italian amateur astronomer and observer of minor planets from Suno in Novara. The name was suggested by Sergio Foglia. || 
|-id=672
| 6672 Corot || 1213 T-1 || Jean-Baptiste-Camille Corot (1796–1875), French painter || 
|-id=673
| 6673 Degas || 2246 T-1 || Edgar Degas (1834–1917), French painter and sculptor || 
|-id=674
| 6674 Cézanne || 4272 T-1 || Paul Cézanne (1839–1906), French painter || 
|-id=675
| 6675 Sisley || 1493 T-2 || Alfred Sisley (1839–1899), French (of English descent) impressionist painter || 
|-id=676
| 6676 Monet || 2083 T-2 || Claude Monet (1840–1926), French painter || 
|-id=677
| 6677 Renoir || 3045 T-3 || Pierre-Auguste Renoir (1841–1919), French painter || 
|-id=678
| 6678 Seurat || 3422 T-3 || Georges Seurat (1859–1891), French painter || 
|-id=679
| 6679 Gurzhij ||  || Andrei Nikolaevich Gurzhii (born 1946), Ukrainian specialist in information measurement and author of several text books || 
|-id=681
| 6681 Prokopovich ||  || Feofan Prokopovich (1681–1736), Ukrainian and Russian writer || 
|-id=682
| 6682 Makarij ||  || Macarius, Metropolitan of Moscow (1482–1563), Russian cleric, writer, and icon painter. In 1542, he became Metropolitan of Moscow and all Russia. || 
|-id=683
| 6683 Karachentsov ||  || Nikolaj Petrovich Karachentsov is an actor and singer at the Moscow Lenkom Theatre. As one review said, "He has a remarkable sense of rhythm and an exceptional voice, captivating audiences with his songs" || 
|-id=684
| 6684 Volodshevchenko || 1977 QU || Volodymyr Shevchenko (1929–1987), Ukrainian film director who died as a result of exposure to radiation while filming at the Chernobyl disaster || 
|-id=685
| 6685 Boitsov ||  || Vasilij Vasil'evich Boitsov (Bojtsov, 1908–1997), specialist on the technology of mechanical engineering and standardization. From 1963 to 1984 he headed the U.S.S.R. State Committee for standards and represented his country in the International Organization for Standardization, of which he served as president (1977–1979). Boitsov was an initiator and active participant in fundamental research on the creation of standard measurement systems. Name suggested by the Institute of Theoretical Astronomy and supported by the discoverer || 
|-id=686
| 6686 Hernius ||  || Olof Hernius, Swedish astronomer with UESAC, the Uppsala–ESO Survey of Asteroids and Comets || 
|-id=687
| 6687 Lahulla ||  || José Felix Lahulla, Spanish astronomer at the Royal Observatory of Madrid–Spanish National Observatory  || 
|-id=688
| 6688 Donmccarthy ||  || Donald W. McCarthy (born 1948), American astronomer and educator at the University of Arizona. He specializes in infrared astronomy and instrumentation and has been an inspiration to his students and to the hundreds who have participated in his Astronomy Camps. || 
|-id=689
| 6689 Floss ||  || Christine Floss (born 1961), American meteoriticist at Washington University in St. Louis || 
|-id=690
| 6690 Messick ||  || Hank H. Messick (born 1955) first taught the discoverer the constellations || 
|-id=691
| 6691 Trussoni || 1984 DX || Edoardo Trussoni (born 1945) is an astrophysicist who has spent most of his career studying high-energy phenomena in active galactic nuclei and stars. He was director of the Osservatorio Astronomico di Torino from 2002 to 2005. The name was suggested by M. Di Martino || 
|-id=692
| 6692 Antonínholý || 1985 HL || Antonín Holý (1936–2012), Czech chemist and contributor to the development of drugs used in the treatment of HIV and hepatitis B || 
|-id=695
| 6695 Barrettduff ||  || Barrett Duff (born 1923) coordinated the formation of the nonprofit, educational outreach organization Telescopes in Education (TIE) Foundation. His efforts were critical to the successful development of the TIE Foundation || 
|-id=696
| 6696 Eubanks ||  || T. Marshall Eubanks, American astronomer at the United States Naval Observatory || 
|-id=697
| 6697 Celentano ||  || Adriano Celentano (born 1938), Italian singer and actor || 
|-id=698
| 6698 Malhotra ||  || Renu Malhotra (born 1961), Indian–American planetary scientist and a discoverer of minor planets|| 
|-id=699
| 6699 Igaueno || 1987 YK || The Japanese town Ueno (Iga-Ueno), located in Mie Prefecture || 
|-id=700
| 6700 Kubišová ||  || Marta Kubišová (born 1942), Czech singer || 
|}

6701–6800 

|-
| 6701 Warhol ||  || Andy Warhol (1928–1987), American artist and leading figure of the pop art movement || 
|-id=705
| 6705 Rinaketty ||  || Rina Ketty (1911–1996), French singer of the 1930s || 
|-id=707
| 6707 Shigeru ||  || Shigeru Nakano (born 1918), doctor of medicine specializing in obstetrics and gynecology and in medical jurisprudence || 
|-id=708
| 6708 Bobbievaile ||  || Bobbie Vaile (1959–1996), Australian astrophysicist || 
|-id=709
| 6709 Hiromiyuki || 1989 CD || Hiroyuki (born 1991) and Miyuki Mori (born 1993), the son and daughter of the second discoverer. || 
|-id=710
| 6710 Apostel ||  || Leo Apostel, Flemish philosopher || 
|-id=711
| 6711 Holliman || 1989 HG || John Holliman (1948–1998), a national correspondent for CNN, the U.S. Cable News Network. || 
|-id=712
| 6712 Hornstein ||  || Karl Hornstein (1824–1882), Czech astronomer and 8th director of the Klementinum observatory (Clementinum) in Prague || 
|-id=713
| 6713 Coggie || 1990 KM || Karin "Coggie" Peterson Messina (born 1934), a dedicated music teacher in Massachusetts who has taught over 600 students how to play the flute. || 
|-id=714
| 6714 Montréal ||  || The Canadian city of Montreal in Quebec || 
|-id=715
| 6715 Sheldonmarks ||  || Sheldon Marks (born 1956), a world-renowned urologist and surgeon whose book Prostate and Cancer has helped thousands of men with serious prostate-gland problems. || 
|-id=717
| 6717 Antal ||  || Milan Antal (1935–1999), a Slovak astronomer || 
|-id=718
| 6718 Beiglböck ||  || Wolf D. Beiglböck (born 1939), German mathematician and professor at the University of Heidelberg. || 
|-id=719
| 6719 Gallaj ||  || Mark Lazarevich Gallaj (1914–), a Soviet test pilot || 
|-id=720
| 6720 Gifu ||  || Gifu, Gifu, Japan, the city of 400 000, capital of the prefecture of the same name, site of ancient battlefields and a modern public observatory. || 
|-id=721
| 6721 Minamiawaji ||  || Minamiawaji, a small city located in southern Awaji island, Japan. || 
|-id=722
| 6722 Bunichi ||  || Bunichi Saito (born 1925), professor emeritus at Niigata University and an expert on the earth's upper atmosphere. || 
|-id=723
| 6723 Chrisclark ||  || Christopher C. Clark, American designer of the Near-Earth Asteroid Tracking camera system at JPL || 
|-id=725
| 6725 Engyoji || 1991 DS || The Engyō-ji temple, located in Himeji, Hyogo prefecture, Japan. || 
|-id=726
| 6726 Suthers || 1991 PS || Paul Graham Sutherland (born 1952) is an amateur astronomer who has been closely involved with the Society for Popular Astronomy. || 
|-id=729
| 6729 Emiko ||  || Emiko Otomo (born 1963), wife of the discoverer || 
|-id=730
| 6730 Ikeda || 1992 BH || Tetsuro Ikeda (1894–1981), Japanese astronomer and director of the International Latitude Observatory of Mizusawa || 
|-id=731
| 6731 Hiei || 1992 BK || Eijiro Hiei (born 1931), professor at Meisei University and professor emeritus of the National Astronomical Observatory of Japan. || 
|-id=734
| 6734 Benzenberg || 1992 FB || Johann Benzenberg (1777–1846), German physicist and astronomer, founder of the Sternwarte Bilk (Bilk Observatory) at Düsseldorf || 
|-id=735
| 6735 Madhatter ||  || The Hatter ("The Mad Hatter"), fictional character from Lewis Carroll's Alice's Adventures in Wonderland. || 
|-id=736
| 6736 Marchare || 1993 EF || March Hare, fictional character from Lewis Carroll's Alice's Adventures in Wonderland. || 
|-id=737
| 6737 Okabayashi || 1993 ER || Shigeki Okabayashi (1913–1944), a self-taught Japanese astronomer. || 
|-id=738
| 6738 Tanabe ||  || Hiroyoshi Tanabe (born 1928), astronomer at the National Astronomical Observatory || 
|-id=739
| 6739 Tärendö ||  || The Swedish village of Tärendö, located in Norrbotten County || 
|-id=740
| 6740 Goff || 1993 GY || Robert and Valerie Goff, American opticians from Tucson, Arizona || 
|-id=741
| 6741 Liyuan || 1994 FX || Li Yuan (1925–), Chinese science writer and popularizer of astronomy || 
|-id=742
| 6742 Biandepei || 1994 GR || Bian Depei (1926–), Chinese science writer and popularizer of astronomy || 
|-id=743
| 6743 Liu || 1994 GS || Joseph H. C. Liu (born 1931), director of Hong Kong Space Museum || 
|-id=744
| 6744 Komoda || 1994 JL || Kazuyoshi Komoda (1915–1967), amateur astronomer in Japan. || 
|-id=745
| 6745 Nishiyama ||  || Minewo Nishiyama (born 1925), amateur astronomer and president of the Chikushi Astronomical Association from 1944 to 1947 || 
|-id=746
| 6746 Zagar || 1994 NP || Francesco Zagar (1900–1976), Italian astronomer, professor at the University of Milan, director of the Brera Astronomical Observatory  || 
|-id=747
| 6747 Ozegahara ||  || Ozegahara, a highland, surrounded by 2000-meter-class mountains, lying astride the three prefectures of Fukushima, Gunma and Niigata. || 
|-id=748
| 6748 Bratton ||  || Durley H. Bratton ( 1923), who has been a mentor and inspiration for amateur astronomers and telescope makers in the Memphis, Tennessee || 
|-id=749
| 6749 Ireentje || 7068 P-L || Irene van Houten, granddaughter of the Dutch astronomers Cornelis and Ingrid van Houten || 
|-id=750
| 6750 Katgert || 1078 T-1 || Peter Katgert (born 1944) and his wife Jet Ketgert-Merkelijn (born 1943), Dutch astronomers at Leiden Observatory || 
|-id=751
| 6751 van Genderen || 1114 T-1 || Arnout van Genderen (born 1936), Dutch astronomer || 
|-id=752
| 6752 Ashley || 4150 T-1 || Ashley Thomas McDermott, American professor of astronomy at the College of the Desert || 
|-id=753
| 6753 Fursenko ||  || Margarita Aleksandrovna Fursenko ( 1931), staff member of the Institute of Theoretical Astronomy during 1955–1997 || 
|-id=754
| 6754 Burdenko ||  || Nikolay Burdenko (1876–1946), Russian neurosurgeon || 
|-id=755
| 6755 Solovʹyanenko ||  || Anatolii Solovyanenko (1932–1999), a Ukrainian singer and People's Artist of the former U.S.S.R. || 
|-id=756
| 6756 Williamfeldman ||  || William C. Feldman (born 1940) is the father of planetary neutron spectroscopy. His ingeniously designed instruments found evidence for ice at the lunar poles, Mercury's north pole, and in the high-latitude subsurface of Mars. He is loved for his open and generous collaborations and unrelenting enthusiasm for science. || 
|-id=757
| 6757 Addibischoff ||  || Adolf Bischoff (born 1955), German meteoriticist and professor at the Institut für Planetologie, Westfälische Wilhelms-Universität Münster || 
|-id=758
| 6758 Jesseowens || 1980 GL || Jesse Owens (1913–1980), American athlete || 
|-id=761
| 6761 Haroldconnolly ||  || Harold C. Connolly (born 1965), American petrologist and meteoriticist || 
|-id=762
| 6762 Cyrenagoodrich ||  || Cyrena A. Goodrich (born 1955), American meteoriticist || 
|-id=763
| 6763 Kochiny ||  || Nikolaj Egrafovich Kochin (1901–1944) and his wife Pelageya Yakovlevna Kochina (1899–), Soviet mathematicians || 
|-id=764
| 6764 Kirillavrov ||  || Kirill Lavrov (1925–2007), Russian actor || 
|-id=765
| 6765 Fibonacci ||  || Fibonacci (c. 1170–1240), Italian mathematician || 
|-id=766
| 6766 Kharms ||  || Daniil Kharms (1905–1942), Russian author of children's books, absurd short stories, and poetry || 
|-id=767
| 6767 Shirvindt ||  || Aleksandr Shirvindt (born 1934), Russian actor || 
|-id=768
| 6768 Mathiasbraun || 1983 RY || Matthias Braun (1684–1738), Bohemian sculptor || 
|-id=769
| 6769 Brokoff ||  || Jan Brokoff (1652–1718) and Ferdinand Brokoff (1688–1731), father and son Bohemian sculptors || 
|-id=770
| 6770 Fugate || 1985 QR || Robert Q. Fugate (born 1943), of the U.S. Starfire Optical Range (SOR) research laboratory || 
|-id=771
| 6771 Foerster ||  || Wilhelm Julius Foerster (1832–1921), German astronomer and discoverer of minor planets || 
|-id=773
| 6773 Kellaway || 1988 LK || Lucy Kellaway (born 1959), British journalist, recipient of the 2006 British Press Award for "Columnist of the Year" || 
|-id=774
| 6774 Vladheinrich ||  || Vladimír Václav Heinrich (1884–1965), Czech astronomer || 
|-id=775
| 6775 Giorgini || 1989 GJ || Jon D. Giorgini, American software developer and contributor to radar astrometry of minor planets. || 
|-id=776
| 6776 Dix ||  || Otto Dix (1891–1969), a German painter and printmaker, best known for depicting the horrors of war || 
|-id=777
| 6777 Balakirev ||  || Mily Balakirev (1837–1910), Russian composer and pianist || 
|-id=778
| 6778 Tosamakoto ||  || Makoto Tosa (born 1944), Japanese astronomer and professor at Tohoku University || 
|-id=779
| 6779 Perrine ||  || Charles Dillon Perrine (1867–1951), American astronomer || 
|-id=780
| 6780 Borodin ||  || Alexander Borodin (1833–1887), Russian composer and chemist || 
|-id=781
| 6781 Sheikhumarrkhan || 1990 OD || Sheik Umar Khan (or Sheikh Humarr Khan; 1975–2014) was a Sierra Leonean virologist. Over his career, he saved hundreds of lives treating those with Lassa fever. In 2014, he led his nation's fight against a deadly Ebola outbreak, saving even more lives and inspiring others with his bravery. || 
|-id=783
| 6783 Gulyaev ||  || Yurij Aleksandrovich Gulyaev (1930–1986), a brilliant Russian singer, People's artist of the U.S.S.R. || 
|-id=784
| 6784 Bogatikov ||  || Yurij Iosifovich Bogatikov (born 1932), a Russian-Ukrainian singer, People's artist of the U.S.S.R. || 
|-id=786
| 6786 Doudantsutsuji || 1991 DT || Doudantsutsuji, the Japanese name for Enkianthus perulatus, an ericaceous deciduous shrub || 
|-id=789
| 6789 Milkey ||  || Robert Milkey (born 1944), American executive officer of the American Astronomical Society || 
|-id=790
| 6790 Pingouin ||  || Pingouin, an Arctic bird, similar to the penguin of Antarctica. The pingouin become extinct in Newfoundland in 1844. || 
|-id=792
| 6792 Akiyamatakashi || 1991 WC || Takashi Akiyama (born 1923), a leader in youth education for many years in Kanaya, Shizuoka. || 
|-id=793
| 6793 Palazzolo || 1991 YE || The Italy city of Palazzolo sull'Oglio in Lombardy || 
|-id=794
| 6794 Masuisakura || 1992 DK || Sakura Masui (born 1968), a Japanese novelist and essayist known for her books about business. || 
|-id=795
| 6795 Örnsköldsvik ||  || Örnsköldsvik Municipality Sweden || 
|-id=796
| 6796 Sundsvall ||  || Sundsvall Municipality Sweden || 
|-id=797
| 6797 Östersund ||  || Östersund Municipality Sweden || 
|-id=798
| 6798 Couperin ||  || Louis Couperin (1626–1661), French Baroque composer || 
|-id=799
| 6799 Citfiftythree || 1993 KM || Caltech's class of 1953 on the occasion of its 50th anniversary of graduation and their contributions to physics, engineering, chemistry, biology, geology, astronomy, mathematics and related fields || 
|-id=800
| 6800 Saragamine || 1994 UC || Mount Saragamine, elevation of 1271 meters, located near the discovering observatory in Ehime, Japan || 
|}

6801–6900 

|-
| 6801 Střekov ||  || Castle near the Ústí nad Labem, in northern Bohemia || 
|-id=802
| 6802 Černovice ||  || The Czech town of Černovice in Bohemia || 
|-id=804
| 6804 Maruseppu || 1995 WV || The Japanese town of Maruseppu, located in Monbetsu District on Hokkaidō || 
|-id=805
| 6805 Abstracta || 4600 P-L || The astronomical bibliography Astronomy and Astrophysics Abstracts (AAA), which was founded in 1969 || 
|-id=806
| 6806 Kaufmann || 6048 P-L || Horst W. Kaufmann (born 1929), German astronomical optician || 
|-id=807
| 6807 Brünnow || 6568 P-L || Franz Brünnow (1821–1891), German astronomer || 
|-id=808
| 6808 Plantin || 1932 CP || Christophe Plantin (c. 1520–1589), bookbinder, publisher and typographer || 
|-id=809
| 6809 Sakuma ||  || Seiichi Sakuma (1929–), Japanese amateur astronomer || 
|-id=810
| 6810 Juanclariá || 1969 GC || Juan José Clariá (born 1945), Argentine astronomer at the Argentine National Observatory in Córdoba || 
|-id=811
| 6811 Kashcheev || 1976 QP || Boris Leonidovich Kashcheev (born 1920), Ukrainian astronomer and professor of radioelectronics at Kharkov Technical University || 
|-id=812
| 6812 Robertnelson ||  || Robert M. Nelson (born 1943) has advanced the understanding of spectrophotometric and angular scattering properties of planetary regoliths, served on Voyager and Cassini instrument teams, and was the Project Scientist for Deep Space 1. He is a strong advocate for scientist privacy rights. || 
|-id=813
| 6813 Amandahendrix ||  || Amanda Hendrix (born 1968) has used UV spectroscopy to expand our knowledge of icy satellites, the Moon, asteroids, Mars and Io, by revealing surface compositions, weathering processes and radiation products. She was Cassini Deputy Project Scientist, worked on LRO LAMP, and assessed Europa missions. || 
|-id=814
| 6814 Steffl ||  || Andrew J. Steffl (born 1977), American astronomer at SwRI || 
|-id=815
| 6815 Mutchler ||  || Max J. Mutchler (born 1965), American astronomer at the Space Telescope Science Institute || 
|-id=816
| 6816 Barbcohen ||  || Barbara A. Cohen (born 1971), American planetary scientist at the University of New Mexico || 
|-id=817
| 6817 Pest ||  || Pest, largest and mostly flat part of the city of Budapest, Hungary || 
|-id=818
| 6818 Sessyu ||  || Sesshū Tōyō (1420-1508), Japanese painter || 
|-id=819
| 6819 McGarvey || 1983 LL || Flora McGarvey Smrekar (1924–1977) had many ambitions and dreamed of pursuing her interests in a satisfying career. She instilled this same goal in her daughter, who became a planetary scientist. Flora faced many obstacles but has finally found a place among the stars || 
|-id=820
| 6820 Buil || 1985 XS || Christian Buil, French astronomer and discoverer of minor planets || 
|-id=821
| 6821 Ranevskaya ||  || Faina Ranevskaya (1896–1984), who was recognized as one of the greatest Soviet actresses || 
|-id=822
| 6822 Horálek || 1986 UO || Petr Horálek (born 1986), a Czech astronomer, astronomy popularizer, passionate photographer, and one of the ESO Photo Ambassadors. || 
|-id=824
| 6824 Mallory ||  || George Mallory (1886-1924), British mountaineer who took part in the 1924 British Everest Expedition|| 
|-id=825
| 6825 Irvine ||  || Andrew Irvine (1902–1924), British mountaineer who took part in the 1924 British Everest Expedition|| 
|-id=826
| 6826 Lavoisier ||  || Antoine Lavoisier (1743-1794), French chemist || 
|-id=827
| 6827 Wombat ||  || The Wombat, a short-legged marsupials that are native to Australia || 
|-id=828
| 6828 Elbsteel ||  || Elliot Steel (born 1995), son of British astronomer Duncan Steel who discovered this minor planet || 
|-id=829
| 6829 Charmawidor ||  || Charles-Marie Widor (1845-1937), French composer || 
|-id=830
| 6830 Johnbackus ||  || John Backus (1924–2007), American computer scientist, inventor of FORTRAN || 
|-id=832
| 6832 Kawabata || 1992 FP || Yasunari Kawabata (1899–1972), Japanese novelist || 
|-id=834
| 6834 Hunfeld || 1993 JH || Jan Hunfeld (1934–2009) was a Dutch journalist at Boom-Pers in Meppel, publisher of the Meppeler Courant. In the 1980s and 1990s he edited a weekly science page in the Courant, in which he included news of the activities of the Royal Dutch amateur-astronomy society. The name was suggested by T. Jurriens || 
|-id=835
| 6835 Molfino ||  || Alberto Molfino (1906–1977), an Italian wrestler || 
|-id=836
| 6836 Paranal ||  || Cerro Paranal, a mountain top in Chile and site of ESO's Very Large Telescopes || 
|-id=837
| 6837 Bressi ||  || Terrence H. Bressi (Terry Bressi), engineer and member of Spacewatch at the Lunar and Planetary Laboratory of the University of Arizona. He has constructed and improved telescopes and equipment for Spacewatch'es minor-planet and comet observations. || 
|-id=838
| 6838 Okuda ||  || Toyozo Okuda (1908-1983), Japanese astronomer and director of International Latitude Observatory at Mizusawa || 
|-id=839
| 6839 Ozenuma ||  || Ozegahara (Ozenuma), a swamp west of the Nikko National Park in Japan || 
|-id=841
| 6841 Gottfriedkirch || 2034 P-L || Gottfried Kirch (1639–1710), German astronomer || 
|-id=842
| 6842 Krosigk || 3016 P-L || Baron Bernhard Friedrich von Krosigk (1656–1714), German amateur astronomer || 
|-id=843
| 6843 Heremon ||  || Érimón (Heremon), legendary Celtic ruler of Iberia and son of Míl Espáine || 
|-id=844
| 6844 Shpak ||  || Vladimir Stepanovich Shpak (born 1909), distinguished technical organic chemist and director of the State Institute of Applied Chemistry in Leningrad (now St. Petersburg) from 1953 to 1977. He was the initiator and organizer of fundamental, scientific and technical investigations of the main organic synthesis processes of new classes of chemical compounds. He has introduced new technologies into the chemical and petrochemical industries. At present he is the chairman of the Northwestern Scientific Board of the Russian Academy of Sciences on burning and the editor-in-chief of the journal Applied Chemistry || 
|-id=845
| 6845 Mansurova ||  || Kira Sergeevna Mansurova (1931–1990), an astronomer in Irkutsk known for her observations with the zenith telescope. She was director of the Astronomical Observatory of Irkutsk University for many years and lecturer of astronomy at the University and Pedagogical Institute in Irkutsk. An active popularizer of astronomy, she published a number of works on astrometry and methods of teaching astronomy || 
|-id=846
| 6846 Kansazan ||  || Kansazan (1748-1827), Japanese philosopher and poet of the Edo era || 
|-id=847
| 6847 Kunz-Hallstein || 1977 RL || Hans Peter Kunz-Hallstein (born 1939), a German lawyer who has been a legal advisor for the European Southern Observatory for more than 20 years. A highlight of his work was the negotiations with the Chilean government over the interpretation, modification and amendment of the ESO-Chile agreement of 1963 || 
|-id=848
| 6848 Casely-Hayford ||  || Adelaide Casely-Hayford (1868–1960) was a Sierra Leonean educator, activist, and feminist. She worked to preserve Sierra Leonean heritage and promote cultural pride under British rule. A talented orator, she promoted African art and started a school for girls. || 
|-id=849
| 6849 Doloreshuerta ||  || Dolores Huerta (born 1930) is a Mexican-American civil rights leader. She co-founded the National Farmworkers Association, which won significant protections for farmworkers. She has won numerous awards for this work, including the Presidential Medal of Freedom in 2012. || 
|-id=851
| 6851 Chianti ||  || The Chianti region, located in a rural part of Tuscany in Italy || 
|-id=852
| 6852 Nannibignami ||  || Giovanni Bignami (born 1944), Italian astrophysicist and president of the Italian Space Agency || 
|-id=853
| 6853 Silvanomassaglia ||  || Silvano Massaglia (born 1951), Italian astrophysicist || 
|-id=854
| 6854 Georgewest || 1987 UG || The small town of George West in South Texas. It is the home of George West High School, and the George West Mobile Observatory, from which physics teacher Kenneth Zeigler and a group of George West High School students have used CCD photometry to determine the rotational periods of many asteroids. || 
|-id=855
| 6855 Armellini || 1989 BG || Giuseppe Armellini (1887–1958), Italian astronomer and professor of astronomy at the University of Rome || 
|-id=856
| 6856 Bethemmons || 1989 EM || Elizabeth Emmons (born 1955), administrator of JPL's Space and Earth Science Division 32 † || 
|-id=857
| 6857 Castelli || 1990 QQ || Benedetto Castelli (1578–1643) studied mathematics in Padova and was a favorite pupil of Galileo, with whom he discussed the significance of the phases of Venus in the Copernican theory. He also published works on fluids in motion, and is universally recognized as the founder of modern hydrodynamics. || 
|-id=859
| 6859 Datemasamune || 1991 CZ || Date Masamune (1567–1636), Japanese ruler, daimyō || 
|-id=860
| 6860 Sims ||  || Alan Sims (1920–1995), a naval officer who moved to Dublin in 1953 and became chairman of the Dublin Astronomy Association. On his retirement in 1983 he moved to Bath, where he took an active part in the William Herschel Society, serving first as secretary and later as vice chairman. He was also editor of the society's bulletin. Historians and librarians around the world corresponded with him, as he answered queries about the Herschels. Named by the discoverers following suggestions by F. Ring and S. Kimura || 
|-id=862
| 6862 Virgiliomarcon || 1991 GL || Virgilio Marcon (1903–1976), Italian telescope maker, painter and teacher of art at San Donà del Piave in Venice || 
|-id=864
| 6864 Starkenburg ||  || The medieval Starkenburg castle, in Hesse, Germany, where the nearby Starkenburg Observatory is located || 
|-id=865
| 6865 Dunkerley ||  || Charlotte Herschel Dunkerley, descendant and genealogist of William Herschel and the Herschel family || 
|-id=866
| 6866 Kukai || 1992 CO || Kūkai (774–835), Japanese buddhism monk || 
|-id=867
| 6867 Kuwano ||  || Yoshiyuki Kuwano (1931-1998), Japanese amateur astronomer || 
|-id=868
| 6868 Seiyauyeda || 1992 HD || Seiya Uyeda (born 1929), Japanese seismologist and professor emeritus at Tokyo University || 
|-id=869
| 6869 Funada || 1992 JP || Takumi Funada (born 1932), Japanese astronomer, science teacher and director of the Sea and Star Museum || 
|-id=870
| 6870 Pauldavies || 1992 OG || Paul Davies (born 1946), Australian physicist, writer and broadcaster || 
|-id=871
| 6871 Verlaine ||  || Paul Verlaine (1844–1896), French poet || 
|-id=873
| 6873 Tasaka ||  || Ichiro Tasaka (born 1929), Japanese amateur astronomer, farmer and astronomical optician || 
|-id=875
| 6875 Golgi ||  || Camillo Golgi (1843–1926) was an Italian scientist, physician and biologist. The Golgi apparatus, Golgi tendon organ, Golgi tendon reflex and Golgi receptor are named after him. In 1906 he was awarded the Nobel Prize in Medicine for his studies on the structure of the nervous system. || 
|-id=876
| 6876 Beppeforti ||  || Giuseppe Forti (1939–2007), Italian astronomer and discoverer of minor planets || 
|-id=877
| 6877 Giada ||  || Giada Casulli (born 1978), daughter of the Italian discoverer Vincenzo Silvano Casulli || 
|-id=878
| 6878 Isamu ||  || Isamu Hirabayashi (born 1941), Japanese amateur astronomer who founded the Japan Lunar and Planetary Observers Network || 
|-id=879
| 6879 Hyogo ||  || The Hyōgo Prefecture in Japan, where the city of Kobe is located and this minor planet was discovered || 
|-id=880
| 6880 Hayamiyu ||  || Yū Hayami (born 1966), Japanese singer and actress || 
|-id=881
| 6881 Shifutsu || 1994 UP || Mount Shifutsu (2228 m), located in the Gunma Prefecture of Japan || 
|-id=882
| 6882 Sormano ||  || Sormano, a village in Italy, home of the Osservatorio Astronomico Sormano (Sormano Astronomical Observatory) † || 
|-id=883
| 6883 Hiuchigatake || 1996 AF || Hiuchigatake (Mount Hiuchi), a 2346-meter volcano in Oze National Park (formerly Nikko National Park) in Fukushima prefecture, Japan || 
|-id=884
| 6884 Takeshisato || 9521 P-L || Takeshi Satō, Japanese educator and director of the planetarium at Hiroshima's Children's Museum || 
|-id=885
| 6885 Nitardy || 9570 P-L || John H. Nitardy, a consultant and communications engineer for the Boeing Company || 
|-id=886
| 6886 Grote || 1942 CG || Grote Reber (1911–2002), American radio astronomer || 
|-id=887
| 6887 Hasuo || 1951 WH || Ryūichi Hasuo (born 1952), a Japanese amateur astronomer (also see ) || 
|-id=890
| 6890 Savinykh || 1975 RP || Viktor Savinykh (born 1940), Russian cosmonaut and author || 
|-id=891
| 6891 Triconia || 1976 SA || Paul, Joe, Charlie and Art who work at the Tri-Con Barber Shop in Lexington, Massachusetts || 
|-id=892
| 6892 Lana ||  || Francesco Lana de Terzi (1631–1687), an Italian Jesuit, professor of physics and mathematics, first explored the concept for a vacuum airship, bringing human flight into the field of science. He also originated the idea and concept of an alphabet for the blind, which was developed later by Louis Braille. || 
|-id=893
| 6893 Sanderson ||  || Richard Sanderson (born 1955) is Curator of Physical Science at the Springfield Science Museum in Massachusetts, USA. He has been actively involved in developing and presenting popular astronomy public outreach programs for several decades. || 
|-id=894
| 6894 Macreid ||  || Macgregor S. Reid, a highly regarded manager at the Jet Propulsion Laboratory. For the past ten years he has been technical executive assistant to the director, responsible for planning and identifying issues of significance to the national space program and the laboratory's future. Reid is internationally recognized for his activities concerning international standard-setting. This object is being named to honor him on his retirement after a 30-year career at JPL. Citation prepared by E. C. Stone || 
|-id=897
| 6897 Tabei || 1987 VQ || Junko Tabei (1939–2016), a Japanese mountaineer || 
|-id=898
| 6898 Saint-Marys || 1988 LE || Saint Mary's University, located in Halifax, Nova Scotia, Canada || 
|-id=899
| 6899 Nancychabot ||  || Nancy Chabot (born 1972), American planetary scientist || 
|}

6901–7000 

|-
| 6901 Roybishop || 1989 PA || Roy L. Bishop, Canadian astronomer and professor of physics at Acadia University. || 
|-id=902
| 6902 Hideoasada ||  || Hideo Asada (born 1953), Japanese telescope maker and popularizer of astronomy || 
|-id=904
| 6904 McGill ||  || McGill University in Montreal, Canada || 
|-id=905
| 6905 Miyazaki || 1990 TW || Isao Miyazaki (born 1961), Japanese amateur astronomer and director of the Jupiter–Saturn Section of the Oriental Astronomical Association (OAA) || 
|-id=906
| 6906 Johnmills || 1990 WC || John Mills (1806–1899), Scottish twine manufacturer and amateur astronomer, benefactor of the first British public observatory, the Mills Observatory || 
|-id=907
| 6907 Harryford || 1990 WE || Harry Ford (born 1938), a Scottish astronomy enthusiast || 
|-id=908
| 6908 Kunimoto ||  || Yoshihiro Kunimoto (born 1958), Japanese composer and synthesizer musician || 
|-id=909
| 6909 Levison ||  || Harold F. Levison (born 1959), American planetary scientist at the Southwest Research Institute || 
|-id=910
| 6910 Ikeguchi || 1991 FJ || Kunio Ikeguchi (born 1953), Japanese amateur astronomer and member of the Yonago Astronomy Club || 
|-id=911
| 6911 Nancygreen || 1991 GN || Nancy Green Hicks, horsewoman and fundraiser for astronomical research || 
|-id=912
| 6912 Grimm ||  || Friedrich Melchior, Baron von Grimm (1723–1807), German encyclopedist || 
|-id=913
| 6913 Yukawa ||  || Hideki Yukawa (1907-1981), Japanese theoretical physicist and 1949 Nobel laureate || 
|-id=914
| 6914 Becquerel || 1992 GZ || Henri Becquerel (1852–1908), French physicist and 1903 Nobel laureate || 
|-id=916
| 6916 Lewispearce || 1992 OJ || Lewis Percival Pearce, infant son of Australian amateur astronomer Andrew Pearce || 
|-id=918
| 6918 Manaslu ||  || Manaslu (Kutang) in the Himalayas, the eighth highest mountain in the world at 8,163 metres (26,781 ft). The summit was first reached by the Japanese party led by Maki Yūkō in 1956 || 
|-id=919
| 6919 Tomonaga || 1993 HP || Shin'ichirō Tomonaga (1906–1979), Japanese theoretical physicist and 1965 Nobel laureate || 
|-id=920
| 6920 Esaki || 1993 JE || Leo Esaki (born 1925), Japanese theoretical physicist and 1973 Nobel laureate || 
|-id=921
| 6921 Janejacobs || 1993 JJ || Jane Jacobs (1916–2006), American-born Canadian writer and activist || 
|-id=922
| 6922 Yasushi ||  || Yasushi Sato (born 1957) is a member of the Matsue Astronomy Club who popularizes astronomy in Shimane. The name was suggested by H. Abe || 
|-id=923
| 6923 Borzacchini || 1993 SD || Baconin Borzacchini (1898–1933), Italian racing driver || 
|-id=924
| 6924 Fukui || 1993 TP || Kenichi Fukui (1918–1998), Japanese chemist and 1981 Nobel laureate || 
|-id=925
| 6925 Susumu ||  || Augustin Susumu Yamamoto (born 1915), Japanese astronomer and director of the Yamamoto Observatory  || 
|-id=927
| 6927 Tonegawa ||  || Susumu Tonegawa (born 1939), Japanese scientist and 1987 Nobel laureate || 
|-id=928
| 6928 Lanna ||  || Vojtěch Lanna (1805-1866), Czech entrepreneur || 
|-id=929
| 6929 Misto || 1994 UE || Angela Misto (1902–1993), mother of Italian amateur astronomer Vincenzo Silvano Casulli, who discovered this minor planet || 
|-id=931
| 6931 Kenzaburo ||  || Kenzaburō Ōe (born 1935), Japanese writer and 1994 Nobel laureate || 
|-id=932
| 6932 Tanigawadake || 1994 YK || Mount Tanigawa, Gunma and Niigata Prefecture, Japan || 
|-id=933
| 6933 Azumayasan || 1994 YW || Mount Azamuya (2354 meters), located in Gunma Prefecture, Japan || 
|-id=935
| 6935 Morisot || 4524 P-L || Berthe Morisot (1841–1895), French impressionist painter || 
|-id=936
| 6936 Cassatt || 6573 P-L || Mary Cassatt (1844–1926), American impressionistic painter and printmaker || 
|-id=937
| 6937 Valadon || 1010 T-2 || Suzanne Valadon (1865–1938), French painter who also modeled for Chavannes, Degas and Renoir || 
|-id=938
| 6938 Soniaterk || 5140 T-2 || Sonia Delaunay (née Terk; 1885–1979), Ukrainian-born designer and founder of the Orphism movement and wife of Robert Delaunay || 
|-id=939
| 6939 Lestone ||  || Town of Leighton Buzzard in south Bedfordshire, England || 
|-id=941
| 6941 Dalgarno || 1976 YA || Alexander Dalgarno (1928–2015), British physicist and professor of astronomy at Harvard University || 
|-id=942
| 6942 Yurigulyaev ||  || Yuri Vasil'evich Gulyaev (born 1935), Russian physicist and director of the Institute of Radio-engineering and Electronics in Moscow || 
|-id=943
| 6943 Moretto ||  || Moretto da Brescia (c. 1498–1554), Italian painter recognized as one of the masters of the Italian Renaissance and produced fine altarpieces and religious works. His works are exhibited all over the world, including at the National Gallery of London. || 
|-id=944
| 6944 Elaineowens ||  || Elaine Owens (born 1947), American long-time administrative coordinator at PSI in Tucson, Arizona. || 
|-id=945
| 6945 Dahlgren ||  || Mats Dahlgren (born 1966), Swedish astronomer || 
|-id=947
| 6947 Andrewdavis ||  || Andrew M. Davis (born 1950), American meteoriticist at the University of Chicago || 
|-id=948
| 6948 Gounelle ||  || Matthieu Gounelle (born 1971), French curator of meteorites at the Muséum national d'histoire naturelle in Paris || 
|-id=949
| 6949 Zissell || 1982 RZ || Ronald E. Zissell (born 1943), American variable star astronomer at Mount Holyoke College || 
|-id=950
| 6950 Simonek || 1982 YQ || Simone Ek, wife of the Belgian discoverer François Dossin, in acknowledgment of the patience and understanding of a dedicated astronomer's wife || 
|-id=952
| 6952 Niccolò || 1986 JT || Niccolò Fulchignoni (born 1991), planetary scientists at the Paris Observatory || 
|-id=953
| 6953 Davepierce ||  || David A. Pierce (born 1936), American astronomy and physics teacher and developer of TV and online courses || 
|-id=954
| 6954 Potemkin ||  || Grigory Potemkin (1739–1791), Russian field marshal, favourite of Catherine the Great || 
|-id=955
| 6955 Ekaterina ||  || Catherine the Great (1729–1796), Empress of Russia || 
|-id=956
| 6956 Holbach ||  || Baron d'Holbach (1723-1789), French-German philosopher and encyclopedist during the French Enlightenment || 
|-id=959
| 6959 Mikkelkocha ||  || Mikkel Kock Augustesen (born 2004), grandson of Danish astronomer Poul Jensen who discovered this minor planet || 
|-id=961
| 6961 Ashitaka || 1989 KA || Mount Ashitaka, Japanese dormant volcano || 
|-id=962
| 6962 Summerscience || 1990 OT || The Summer Science Program, a college-level summer program for gifted high school students || 
|-id=964
| 6964 Kunihiko ||  || Kunihiko Kodaira (1915–1997), Japanese mathematician || 
|-id=965
| 6965 Niyodogawa ||  || The Niyodo River, on Shikoku in Japan || 
|-id=966
| 6966 Vietoris ||  || Leopold Vietoris (1891–2002), Austrian mathematician || 
|-id=969
| 6969 Santaro ||  || Santarō Harada (1913–), Japanese astronomer and optical engineer || 
|-id=970
| 6970 Saigusa ||  || Yosikazu Saigusa (born 1928), Japanese amateur astronomer and discoverer of comets C/1975 T2 and C/1983 J1 || 
|-id=971
| 6971 Omogokei || 1992 CT || Omogokei, a deep narrow gorge at the foot of Mount Ishizuti in Ehime Prefecture, Japan || 
|-id=972
| 6972 Helvetius ||  || Claude Adrien Helvétius (1715-1771), French philosopher and encyclopedist || 
|-id=973
| 6973 Karajan || 1992 HK || Herbert von Karajan (1908–1989), an Austrian orchestra conductor || 
|-id=974
| 6974 Solti || 1992 MC || Georg Solti (1912–1997), Hungarian-British orchestra conductor || 
|-id=975
| 6975 Hiroaki || 1992 QM || Hiroaki Hayashi (born 1954), Japanese amateur astronomer and instructor of DIY telescopes for children || 
|-id=976
| 6976 Kanatsu ||  || Kazuyoshi Kanatsu (born 1953), a Japanese amateur astronomer and discoverer of  || 
|-id=977
| 6977 Jaucourt ||  || Louis de Jaucourt (1704–1779), French writer and encyclopedist || 
|-id=978
| 6978 Hironaka || 1993 RD || Heisuke Hironaka (born 1931), Japanese mathematician || 
|-id=979
| 6979 Shigefumi || 1993 RH || Shigefumi Mori (born 1951), Japanese mathematician || 
|-id=980
| 6980 Kyusakamoto ||  || Kyu Sakamoto (1941–1985), Japanese singer. This minor planet also honors the other members of the musical trio: Rokusuke Ei (lyricist) and Hachidai Nakamura (composer). (In Japanese, "Roku" means "6", "Kyu" is "9", and "Hachi" is "8"). || 
|-id=981
| 6981 Chirman ||  || The Surgical Department of the hospital in the Italian village of Manerbio, located a few kilometers from the Bassano Observatory. The name, a contraction of Chirurgia (Surgery) and the name of the village, is presented in honor of the doctors, nurses and all the personnel of the hospital for the competence, absorption and passion they devote to the care of patients || 
|-id=982
| 6982 Cesarchavez ||  || Cesar Chavez (1927–1993) was a Mexican-American civil rights leader. He co-founded the National Farmworkers Association, which won significant protections for farmworkers. His birthday is a holiday in several US states, and he received the Presidential Medal of Freedom in 1994. || 
|-id=983
| 6983 Komatsusakyo || 1993 YC || Sakyo Komatsu (1931–2011), Japanese science fiction writer || 
|-id=984
| 6984 Lewiscarroll || 1994 AO || Lewis Carroll (1832–1898), English writer famous for his novel Alice's Adventures in Wonderland || 
|-id=986
| 6986 Asamayama || 1994 WE || Mount Asama, located in the Nagano Prefecture of Japan || 
|-id=987
| 6987 Onioshidashi || 1994 WZ || Onioshidashi lava flow, Mount Asama, Japan || 
|-id=989
| 6989 Hoshinosato ||  || Observation point of amateur astronomers, Minano, Saitama, Japan || 
|-id=990
| 6990 Toya ||  || Mount Toya, Minano, Saitama, Japan || 
|-id=991
| 6991 Chichibu || 1995 AX || The Japanese city of Chichibu, located in Saitama Prefecture || 
|-id=992
| 6992 Minano-machi ||  || Minano-town, Saitama, Japan || 
|-id=995
| 6995 Minoyama ||  || Mout Minoyama (elevation 587 metres above sea level) located in Saitama, Japan || 
|-id=996
| 6996 Alvensleben || 2222 T-2 || Bertha von Alvensleben (1859–1912), wife of German Protestant clergyman  and grandmother of astronomer Joachim Schubart || 
|-id=997
| 6997 Laomedon || 3104 T-3 || Laomedon, king of Troy from Greek mythology || 
|-id=998
| 6998 Tithonus || 3108 T-3 || Tithonus, prince of Troy and lover of Eos from Greek mythology || 
|-id=999
| 6999 Meitner || 4379 T-3 || Lise Meitner (1878–1968), Austrian nuclear physicist || 
|-id=000
| 7000 Curie || 1939 VD || Marie Curie (1867–1934), Polish physicist || 
|}

References 

006001-007000